This is an incomplete list of prominent political families. Monarchical dynasties are not included, unless certain descendants have played political roles in a republican structure (e.g. Arslan family of Lebanon and Cakobau family of Fiji).

Albania

The Hoxha family
Hysen Hoxha (Albanian independence leader; uncle of Enver Hoxha)
Enver Hoxha (First Secretary of the Albanian Labour Party, 1944–1985)
Nexhmije Hoxha (member of the Central Committee of the Albanian Labour Party; wife of Enver Hoxha)

Peristeri family
Manush Myftiu (Chairman of the Assembly of the Republic)
Pilo Peristeri (member of the Central Committee of the Albanian Labour Party)

The Nano family (father-son)
Thanas Nano (government broadcaster under Hoxha)
Fatos Nano (Prime Minister of Albania)

The Pashko family (spouses)
Josif Pashko (member of the Central Committee of the Albanian Labour Party)
Eleni Terezi (member of the Central Committee of the Albanian Labour Party)

The Shehu family
Mehmet Shehu (Prime Minister of Albania, 1953–1981)
Fiqrete Shehu (member of the Central Committee of the Albanian Labour Party)
Kadri Hazbiu (member of the Central Committee of the Albanian Labour Party); brother-in-law of Mehmet Shehu)
Fecor Shehu (nephew of Mehmet Shehu)

Angola
The dos Santos–Van-Dúnem-Vieira Dias family
José Eduardo dos Santos (President of Angola, 1979–2017)
Fernando da Piedade Dias dos Santos 'Nandó' (cousin of José Eduardo dos Santos; Vice-President of Angola, 2010–2012; Speaker of the National Assembly 2008–2010; Prime Minister 2002–2008)
Cândido Pereira dos Santos Van-Dúnem (cousin of the President and Kopelipa and Jose Vieira Dias Van-Dunem; Defense Minister).
José Vieira Dias Van-Dúnem (cousin of Kopelipa; Health Minister)
Gen. Manuel Hélder Vieira Dias 'Kopelipa' (Minister of State and Chief of the Military Bureau of the President)
Carlo Alberto Lopes (Finance Minister, brother-in-law of the President)
Luzia Inglês Van-Dúnem Secretary-General of "OMA", the women's mass movement of the ruling party MPLA
 Afonso Van-Dúnem M'Binda (husband of Luzia Inglês Van-Dúnem; Minister of External Relations 1985–1988)
 Fernando José de França Dias Van-Dúnem (cousin of Kopelipa; Prime Minister 1991–1992; 1996–1999)
 Pedro de Castro van Dúnem, 1942–1997 (Minister of External Relations of Angola 1989–1992; Minister of Public Works and Urban Affairs 1992–1997)

Antigua and Barbuda
The Bird family
Sir Vere Cornwall Bird (Prime Minister of Antigua and Barbuda, 1981–1994)
Lester Bird (son of Sir Vere Cornwall Bird; Prime Minister of Antigua and Barbuda, 1994–2004)
Vere Bird, Jr. (son of Sir Vere Cornwall Bird; Member of Parliament)
 Maria Bird-Browne (niece of Lester Bird; Member of Parliament)
 Gaston Browne (husband of Maria, Prime Minister of Antigua and Barbuda, 2014–present)

The Frank family (uncle-nephew)
Sir Hilbourne Frank (Chairman of the Barbuda Council)
Mackenzie Frank (Senator)

Argentina

Armenia
The Demirchyan family (father-son)
Karen Demirchyan (First Secretary of the Armenian Communist Party, 1974–1988; National Assembly speaker, 1999)
Stepan Demirchyan (leader of the People's Party of Armenia, opposition candidate during the 2003 presidential election)

The Sargsyan brothers
Vazgen Sargsyan (Defense Minister of Armenia 1991–1992, 1995–1999; Prime Minister of Armenia, 1999)
Aram Sargsyan (Prime Minister of Armenia, 1999–2000)

The Margaryan family (father-son)
Andranik Margaryan (Prime Minister of Armenia, 2000–2007)
Taron Margaryan (Mayor of Yerevan, 2011–2018)

Australia

Austria
The Habsburg family of Austria (grandfather–father–children)
Charles I (Karl I) (Emperor of Austria 1916–1918, King of Hungary 1916–1918)
Otto von Habsburg (German Member of the European Parliament), son of Charles I
Karl Habsburg-Lothringen (former Austrian Member of the European Parliament), son of Otto
Georg von Habsburg (György) (Hungarian Ambassador), son of Otto
Archduchess Walburga of Austria, Member of the Swedish Parliament, daughter of Otto

Azerbaijan
The Aliyev family (father-son)
Heydar Aliyev (President of Azerbaijan, 1993–2003)
Ilham Aliyev (President of Azerbaijan, 2003–)
Mehriban Aliyeva (Vice President of Azerbaijan, 2017–, wife of Ilham Aliyev)

The Bahamas
The Butler family
Sir Milo Butler (Governor-General of the Bahamas, 1973–1979)
Loretta Butler-Turner

The Pindling family
Sir Lynden Pindling (Prime Minister of the Bahamas, 1967–1992)
Dame Marguerite Pindling (Governor-General of the Bahamas, 2014–present; wife)
Michelle Pindling-Sands (daughter)

The Symonette family
Sir Roland Symonette (Premier of the Bahamas, 1964–1967)
Robert Symonette (Speaker of the House of Assembly; son)
Brent Symonette (Deputy Prime Minister; son)

The Turnquest family
Sir Orville Turnquest (Governor-General of the Bahamas, 1995–2001)
Tommy Turnquest (Minister of National Security; son)

The Foulkes family
Sir Arthur Foulkes (Governor-General of the Bahamas, 2010–2014) 
Dion Foulkes (Minister of Labour and Social Services; son)

Bangladesh
Political Family of Bangladesh
The Sheikh family
Bangabandhu Sheikh Mujibur Rahman founding father of Bangladesh, President of Bangladesh, 1971; Prime Minister of Bangladesh, (1972–1975)
Sheikh Kamal - eldest son of Sheikh Mujib, freedom fighter of Bangladesh Liberation war, was widely expected to be the successor of his father until he was killed alongside him
Sheikh Jamal - son of Sheikh Mujibur Rahman, freedom fighter of Bangladesh Liberation war
Sheikh Hasina Wazed (eldest daughter of Sheikh Mujibur Rahman; Prime Minister of Bangladesh, 1996–2001 and 2009–)
Sajeeb Wazed – son of Sheikh Hasina, on 25 February 2009, Wazed officially joined the Awami League as a primary member of the Rangpur District
Sheikh Rehana - youngest daughter of Sheikh Mujibur Rahman
Tulip Siddiq - nephew of Sheikh Mujibur Rahman, daughter of Sheikh Rehana,  Member of British Parliament
Sheikh Abu Naser - brother of Sheikh Mujibur Rahman, member of Mukti Bahini, freedom fighter of Bangladesh Liberation war
Sheikh Helal Uddin - son of Sheikh Abu Naser, Awami League politician and member of parliament from Bagerhat-1
Sheikh Fazlul Haque Mani - nephew of the Sheikh Mujibur Rahman, founder of the Mujib Bahini, freedom fighter of Bangladesh Liberation war, founding chairman of the Jubo League
Sheikh Fazle Noor Taposh - son of Sheikh Fazlul Haque Mani,  Mayor of South Dhaka
Sheikh Shahidul Islam, nephew of Sheikh Mujibur Rahman

The Zia family
Ziaur Rahman – (President of Bangladesh, 1979–1981; freedom fighter, military administrator and statesman)
Begum Khaleda Zia, (wife of Ziaur Rahman; Prime Minister of Bangladesh, 1991–1996 and 2001–2006).
Tarique Rahman - eldest son of Ziaur Rahman and Khaleda Zia; Senior Vice-Chairman of the Bangladesh Nationalist Party
Arafat Rahman - youngest son of Ziaur Rahman and Khaleda Zia; former Chairman of the Development Committee of Bangladesh Cricket Board
Sayeed Iskander - was a Bangladeshi politician and army major. He was a former member of  parliament and brother of Khaleda Zia.
Khurshida Jahan - was the Minister of Women's and Children's Affairs of Bangladesh from 2001 to 2006, serving under her sister, Prime Minister Khaleda Zia.
Shahrin Islam Tuhin - is a Bangladeshi politician and former Member of Parliament and Nephew of Khaleda Zia.
Saiful Islam Duke - is a retired Lieutenant Commander of Bangladesh Navy. He is the nephew of Khaleda Zia.

The Dhaka Nawab family
Sir Khawaja Nazimuddin (former Governor General of Pakistan, former Prime Minister of Pakistan)
Khan Saheb Syed Khwaja Khairuddin
Khwaja Nooruddin (founder of first Muslim English daily in India i.e. Star of India which later became The Morning News).
Khwaja Shahabuddin
Lt. Gen (retd) Khwaja Wasiuddin
Farhat Banu (first Muslim woman elected to undivided Bengal Assembly).
Syed Shahib-e-Alam
Begum Shamsunnahar Khwaja Ahsanullah (wife of Nawabzada Ahsanullah, former leader of the BNP, former BNP MP from 1991 to 1996, 1996, & 2001–2006)

The Nawab family of Dhanbari-Bogura
Syed Nawab Ali Chowdhury -  Nawab of Dhanbari of Tangail in British India, first Muslim minister of united Bengal, one of the founders of Dhaka University, 
Syed Hasan Ali Chowdhury - son of Syed Nawab Ali Chowdhury. Minister for Commerce and Industry East Pakistan,  member of the Bengal Legislative Assembly
Mohammad Ali Bogra - grandson of Syed Nawab Ali Chowdhury. President of Pakistan Muslim League,  prime minister of Pakistan

The Siddikys of Baliadi*
Nawab Shah Kutubuddin Ahmed Siddiky Koka (First Subedar of Bengal under the Mughal Empire)
Khan Bahadur Chowdhury Kazemuddin Ahmed Siddiky (Zamindar of Baliadi, Co-founder of the University of Dhaka, founder President of the *East Bengal and Assam Provincial Muslim League)[1]
Khan Bahadur Chowdhury Fariduddin Ahmed Siddiky (Founder, Salimullah Muslim Orphanage)
Khan Bahadur Chowdhury Labibuddin Ahmed Siddiky (First Elected Chairman, Dhaka Education Board; Court Member, Dhaka University)
Justice Badruddin Ahmed Siddiky (last Chief Justice of East Pakistan, Permanent Representative of Bangladesh to the United Nations)
Chowdhury Abraruddin Ahmed Siddiky (former Mayor of Dhaka)
Chowdhury Tanbir Ahmed Siddiky (former Commerce Minister of Bangladesh)
Chowdhury Dabir Ahmed Siddiky (former President of Dhaka Club)

The Chowdhury family of Chittagong
Forefathers from Gour
Iqbal Ali Chowdhury – former MNA, British Empire
Khan Bahadur Abdul Jabbar Chowdhury – married to Begum Fatema Khatun Chowdhury, granddaughter of poet Rahimunnessa
Fazlul Kabir Chowdhury – former opposition leader, Pakistan National Assembly, founding President of Chittagong Chamber of Commerce
A.B.M. Fazle Karim Chowdhury- MP from Chittagong-6, Chairman of the Parliamentary Standing Committee on the ministry of Railways and Australia-Bangladesh Parliamentary association, President of the Committee on the Human Rights of Parliamentarians in the Inter Parliamentary Union, Member of the Parliamentary Standing Committee on the Ministry of Chittagong Hill Tracts, President of Chittagong Awami League (North)
Professor Masuda M Rashid Chowdhury, MP, Presidium Member, Jatiya Party
Fazlul Quader Chowdhury – former Speaker of Pakistan National Assembly, former acting President of Pakistan, President of Muslim League, Leader of Al Badr, Razakars and Al Shams during the liberation war of Bangladesh in 1971
Salahuddin Quader Chowdhury – former Cabinet Minister, former adviser to the Prime Minister, Member of BNP standing committee, MP Bangladesh Nationalist Party parliamentarian from Chittagong – 2  Convicted War criminal of Bangladesh Liberation War
Giasuddin Quader Chowdhury – former MP, President of Chittagong BNP (South) of Bangladesh Nationalist Party
A.B.M. Mohiuddin Chowdhury, former Mayor of Chittagong.
Mohibul Hasan Chowdhury, current Deputy Minister of Education and a MP from Chittagong-9.
Saber Hossain Chowdhury, MP, Chairman of the Parliamentary Standing Committee on the Ministry of Environment, President of the Inter Parliamentary Union, former Deputy Minister, former Political Secretary to the Prime Minister
Khurrum Khan Choudhury- former Member of Parliament, from Nandail and Ishwarganj, Founder Member Bangladesh Nationalist Party, President of Mymensingh (North) Bangladesh Nationalist Party, former member of Dhaka University Senate
Ashiqur Rahman Chowdhury, MP, Chairman of the Parliamentary Special Committee on Public Accounts, former State Minister
Manzur Ahmed Chowdhury – MLA (Independent)
M.A Haque – former Cabinet Minister (Jatiya Party)
Advocate A.B.M. Fazle Rashid Chowdhury, former Presidium Member, Jatiya Party
Closely linked to Khan Choudhury family: Morshed Khan (former Minister), Saifur Rahman (former Minister), Amir Khosru Mahmud Chowdhury (former Minister), Jafrul Islam Chowdhury (former State Minister), Abdullah Al Noman (former Minister) and other elites. Political in-laws and reputed businessmen are not mentioned in this list. Termed as one of the seven families of Bangladesh.

The Zaman family of Gopalganj
Wahiduzzaman (former Commerce Minister of undivided Pakistan)
Fayekuzzaman (former member of National Assembly, Pakistan)
Dr. Wasim Alimuz Zaman (Senior UN Official, Member of the Civil Service of Pakistan and Bangladesh, PhD, Harvard University)
F.E. Sharfuzzaman (former Member of Parliament)
Borhanuzzaman Omar (former councilor/chairman of Dhaka City Corporation)

The Mansur Ali family
Captain Mansur Ali (Prime Minister of Bangladesh 1975)
Eldest son of Dr Mohammad Selim (Presidium member of Awami league, Chairman of Foreign affairs standing committee, Member of Bangladesh Parliament 1995–2001)
Second son of Mohammad Nasim (Minister for Home and Telecommunications 1996–-2001, Member of Bangladesh Parliament 1991–2006) Health Minister and Presidium Member for Awami league 2014.

The Ahmad family
 Tajuddin Ahmad, (first Prime Minister of Bangladesh, 1971)
 Begum Zohra Tajuddin, (President of the Awami League, 1975–1979) 
Tanjim Ahmad, (Minister of State for Home Affairs, 2009)
Simeen Hussain, (Member of Parliament, 2012–present)

The Chowdhury family
A. Q. M. Badruddoza Chowdhury, (President of Bangladesh, 2001–2003; founder of Bikalpa Dhara Bangladesh) 
Mahi B. Chowdhury, eldest son of Badruddoza Chowdhury; former Member of Parliament, 2003–2006)

The Huq family
 Sher-e-Bangla A. K. Fazlul Huq, (Prime Minister of Bengal in British India and Governor and Chief Minister of East Pakistan)
 A. K. Faezul Huq, (Cabinet Minister, 1996–2001)

The Abdullah al Mahmood family of Sirajganj
Abdullah al Mahmood (former MLA of British India, 1937; former Deputy High Commissioner, 1947; and former Industrial & Natural Resources Minister of Pakistan, 1964)
Iqbal Hassan Mahmood Tuku (former Member of Parliament 1986–1990, and former State minister for Power of Bangladesh 2001–2006)
Manzur Hassan Mahmood Khushi (former Chairman, Sirajganj Pourashava 1984–1993)
Rumana Mahmood (daughter-in-law of Abdullah al Mahmood; Member of Parliament 2009–2013)
Dr. M.A Matin (son-in-law of Abdullah al Mahmood) former Deputy Prime Minister of Bangladesh, former Parliament Member 1979–2006, Founder Secretary General of Jatiya Party.

The Rahman/Ghaani family
Mashiur Rahman, (Former MNA, 1962-1969; Former Deputy Leader of the Opposition of Pakistan, 1962-1964; Former Senior Minister of Bangladesh, with the rank and status of Prime Minister, in charge of the Ministry of Railways, Roads and Highways, 1978–1979)
 Shawfikul Ghaani Shapan, (son of Mashiur Rahman; Former Member of Parliament, 1979-1988; Former Cabinet Minister, 1984-1988)
Jebel Rahman Ghaani (son of Shawfikul Ghaani Shapan; Chairman of Bangladesh National Awami Party, 2009-present)
Mansura Mohiuddin (daughter of Mashiur Rahman; Former Member of Parliament, 1986-1991)

The Abdul family of Sylhet
Abdul Hamid (1886–1963), former Education Minister of East Bengal
Hafiza Banu
Abu Ahmad Abdul Hafiz (1900–1985), Muslim League politician and lawyer. Married to Syeda Shahar Banu
Abul Maal Abdul Muhith (1934–2022), former Finance Minister of Bangladesh
Abul Kalam Abdul Momen (born 1947), current Foreign Minister of Bangladesh
Shahla Khatun, National Professor of Bangladesh

Barbados
The Adams family (father-son)
Sir Grantley Herbert Adams (Premier of Barbados, 1954–1958)
Tom Adams (Prime Minister of Barbados, 1976–1985)

The Barrow family (brother-sister)
Errol Barrow (Prime Minister of Barbados, 1961–1976 and 1986–1987)
Dame Nita Barrow (Governor-General of Barbados, 1990–1995)

Belgium
Anciaux family (father and sons)
Vic Anciaux (1931–) (VU party leader, Brussels State Secretary)
Jan Anciaux (1958–) N-VA (Schepen in Vilvoorde)
Bert Anciaux (1959–) sp.a (VU party leader, Flemish Minister, Belgian Senator)
Koen Anciaux (1961–) Open Vld (Schepen in Mechelen)
Roel Anciaux (1971–) sp.a (member of Flemish Brabant Provincial Council)

de Brouckère brothers
Henri de Brouckère (1801–91) (Prime Minister of Belgium)
Charles de Brouckère (1796–1860) (Minister of Finance, Interior and War)

De Croo family (father-son)
Herman De Croo (1937–) Open Vld (Minister, Speaker of the Chamber, Minister of State)
Alexander De Croo (1975–) Open Vld (VLD party leader; Deputy PM and Minister of Pensions, Prime Minister of Belgium 2020-incumbent)

De Gucht family (father-son)
Karel De Gucht (1954–) Open Vld (Minister of Foreign Affairs, European Commissioner)
Jean-Jacques De Gucht (1983–) Open Vld (Senator)

Dehousse family (father-son)
Fernand Dehousse (1906–76) (Minister of Education)
Jean-Maurice Dehousse (1936–) (Minister-President of Wallonia)

Eyskens family (father-son)
Gaston Eyskens (1905–88) CVP (Prime Minister of Belgium)
Mark Eyskens (1933–) CD&V (Prime Minister of Belgium)

Spaak family
Paul Janson (1840–1913) Lib. (Senator)
Paul-Emile Janson (1872–1944) Lib. (Prime Minister of Belgium, son of Paul Janson)
Marie Janson (1873–1960) PSB (Senator; daughter of Paul Janson)
Paul-Henri Spaak (1899–1972) PSB (Prime Minister of Belgium, Secretary General of NATO; son of Marie Janson)
Antoinette Spaak (1928–2020) FDF (Member of the European Parliament; daughter of Paul-Henri Spaak)

Simonet family (father-son)
Henri Simonet (1931–96) (Minister of Economy and Foreign Affairs)
Jacques Simonet (1963–2007) (Minister-President of the Brussels-Capital Region)

Vanderpoorten family
Arthur Vanderpoorten (1884–1945) Lib. (Minister of Interior)
Herman Vanderpoorten (1922–84) PVV (Minister of Interior and Justice; son of Arthur Vanderpoorten)
Marleen Vanderpoorten (1954–;) Open Vld (Minister of Education, Speaker of the Flemish Parliament; daughter of Herman Vanderpoorten)
Patrick Dewael (1955–;) Open Vld (Minister-President of Flanders, President of the Chamber of Representatives; nephew of Herman Vanderpoorten)

Van Rompuy family
Herman Van Rompuy (1947–;) CD&V (President of the Chamber of Representatives, Prime Minister, President of the European Council)
Peter Van Rompuy (1980–;) CD&V (Senator, son of Herman Van Rompuy)
Eric Van Rompuy (1949–;) CD&V (Minister of Agriculture and Economy, brother of Herman Van Rompuy)

Benin
The Soglo family
Christophe Soglo (President of Benin, 1963–64 and 1965–67)
Nicéphore Soglo (nephew; President of Benin, 1991–96)
Saturnin Soglo (brother of Nicéphore Soglo; Foreign Minister)

The Zinsou family
Émile Derlin Zinsou (President of Benin, formerly Dahomey, 1968–69)
Lionel Zinsou (nephew; Prime Minister of Benin, 2015–2016)

Bhutan
Dorji family
 Sonam Topgay Dorji (Chief Minister of Bhutan, 1917–52)
 Jigme Palden Dorji (Prime Minister of Bhutan, 1952–64; son of Sonam Topgay Dorji)
 Lhendup Dorji (Prime Minister of Bhutan, 1964; son of Sonam Topgay Dorji)

Bolivia
The Ballivián family (father-son)
 José Ballivián (1805–1852) (President of Bolivia, 1841–47)
 Adolfo Ballivián (1831–1874) (President of Bolivia, 1873–74)

The Fernandez Saucedo family
 Max Jhonny Fernandez Saucedo (1964-) (Mayor of Santa Cruz de la Sierra, 1996–2002 and 2021–present)
 Paola Andrea Fernandez Rea (1992-) (Senator for Santa Cruz, 2020–present; daughter of Jhonny Fernandez Saucedo)
 Roberto Fernandez Saucedo (1968-) (Deputy for Santa Cruz, 1997-1998; Mayor of Santa Cruz de la Sierra, 2002–05)

The Morales Ayma family
 Juan Evo Morales Ayma (1959-) (President of Bolivia, 2006–2019)
 Esther Morales Ayma de Wilcarani (1949-2020) (First Lady of Bolivia, 2006-2019)
 Adhemar Wilcarani Morales (1978-) (Mayor of Oruro, 2021–present; son of Esther Morales Ayma)

The Paz family
 Luis Paz Arce (1854-1928) (President of the Supreme Court of Bolivia, 1926–30)
  (1910–1984) (Bolivian Army General; son of Luis Paz Arce)
 Jaime Paz Zamora (1939-) (President of Bolivia, 1989–93; son of Domingo Paz Rojas)
 Jaime Paz Pereira (?-) (Deputy for Tarija, 2002–05; son of Jaime Paz Zamora)
 Rodrigo Paz Pereira (1967-) (Senator for Tarija, 2020–present; Mayor of Tarija, 2015-2020; son of Jaime Paz Zamora)
 Domingo Paz Arce (1855-1910) (Prefect and Commander General of Tarija, 1892–96)
 Domingo Paz Rojas (1879-1930) (Senator for Tarija; son of Domingo Paz Arce)
 Ángel Victor Paz Estenssoro (1907-2001) President of Bolivia, 1952–56, 1960–64 and 1985–89; son of Domingo Paz Rojas)
 Moira Paz Estenssoro Cortez (?-) (Minister of Sustainable Development, 2003; Senator for Tarija, 2002; daughter of Victor Paz Estenssoro)

The Siles family
 Hernando Siles Reyes (1882–1942) (President of Bolivia, 1926–30)
 Hernán Siles Zuazo (1914–1996) (President of Bolivia, 1950–60 and 1982–85; son of Hernando Siles Reyes)
 Luis Adolfo Siles Salinas (1925–2005) (President of Bolivia, 1969; son of Hernando Siles Reyes)

Bosnia and Herzegovina
The Izetbegović family (husband-wife-son)
Bakir Izetbegović (President of Bosnia and Herzegovina, 2010–2018)
Alija Izetbegović (first President of the Presidency of Bosnia and Herzegovina 1990–2000)
The Pozderac family

 Agha Murat Pozderac (1862–1930), was the last leader of Cazin, Bosnia and Herzegovina during Ottoman rule.
 Nurija Pozderac (1892–1943), son of Murat, member of Kingdom of Yugoslavia Parliament, Vice President of the Executive Board of the Anti-Fascist Council of National Liberation of Yugoslavia.
 Hakija Pozderac (1919–1994), son of Nurija Pozderac, Yugoslav politician: Republic Prosecutor for War Crimes committed in Districts Banja Luka and Bihać (Jan. 1947-1948), National Representative of Cazin to Republic Parliament (1948-1949), General Secretary of the Government of Bosnia and Herzegovina (1949-1952), State Secretary for Economic Relations of National Republic of BiH (1953-1954), Head of State Secretariat for Budgeting and Economy of National Republic of BiH (1954-1956), Director of BiH National Bank (1956-1960), Head of Economic Relations Department in National Republic of BiH (1960-1962), Federal Secretary for Economy (1962-1965), Federal Secretary for Industry and Trade (1965-1967), Representative in Federal Executive Council (1967-1971), Representative in Federal Assembly of Yugoslavia (1971-1982), Representative in the Council of Federation (1982-1983).
 Hamdija Pozderac (1924–1988), nephew of Nurija Pozderac. communist politician and the president of Bosnia and Herzegovina from 1971 to 1974. He was a vice president of the former Yugoslavia in the late 1980s, and was in line to become the president of Yugoslavia just before he was forced to resign from politics in 1987.
 Vuk Jeremić (born 1975), Serbian politician, Minister of Foreign Affairs of Serbia from 2007 until 2012. President of the 67th session of the United Nations General Assembly between September 2012 and September 2013. Great-grandson of Nurija Pozderac.
 Hamdija Lipovača (born 1976), Bosnian politician: Prime Minister of Una-Sana Canton (2011-2015), Minister of the Interior (2013-2014), Mayor of Bihać (2004-2010), Member of the House of Representatives of Bosnia and Herzegovina (2010-2014). Great-grandson of Nurija Pozderac.

Botswana
The Khama family (husband-wife-son)
Sir Seretse Khama (President, 1966–80)
Ruth Williams Khama (politically active First Lady)
Ian Khama (President, 2008–18)

Brazil
The Assed-Matheus (also known as Garotinho) family (spouses and daughter)
Anthony Garotinho (presidential candidate and Governor of Rio de Janeiro State)
Rosângela Assed Matheus Garotinho (Governor of Rio de Janeiro State)
Clarissa Assed Matheus Garotinho (Deputy for Rio de Janeiro State; daughter of Antonhy and Rosângela)

The Bolsonaro family (father and sons)
Jair Bolsonaro (President of Brazil)
Flávio Bolsonaro (Senator for Rio de Janeiro, son of Jair Bolsonaro)
Eduardo Bolsonaro (Federal Deputy of São Paulo, son of Jair Bolsonaro)
Carlos Bolsonaro (Councillor of Rio de Janeiro, son of Jair Bolsonaro)

The Brás-Moreira family (cousins)
Venceslau Brás (President of Brazil, 1914–18)
Delfim Moreira (President of Brazil, 1918–19)

The Cardoso family

Leônidas Cardoso (Federal Deputy for São Paulo 1955-1959)
Fernando Henrique Cardoso (President of Brazil, 1995–2003; son of Leônidas Cardoso)

The Coimbra-Luz family
Cesário Cecílio de Assis Coimbra (mayor of Cabo Verde, Minas Gerais)
Carlos Luz (President of Brazil (1955); grandson of Cesário Cecílio)
Joaquim Delfino Ribeiro da Luz (Minister; paternal uncle of Carlos)
Américo Gomes Ribeiro da Luz (Federal Deputy; paternal uncle of Carlos)
Leovigildo Leal da Paixão (Minas Gerais Regional Electoral Justice; son-in-law of Américo)
Alberto Gomes Ribeiro da Luz (Minas Gerais Court Justice: father of Carlos)

The Collor-Mello family
Lindolfo Collor (Minister of Labor)
Arnon Farias de Mello (Governor of Alagoas; son-in-law of Lindolfo Collor)
Fernando Collor de Mello (President of Brazil, 1990–92; son of Arnon Farias de Mello)
Euclides Vieira Malta (Governor of Alagoas; uncle-in-law of Fernando; see The Malta-Ribeiro family for details)

The Costa family
João José Teodoro da Costa (State Deputy in Santa Catarina)
Otacílio Vieira da Costa (State Deputy in Santa Catarina; son of João José)
Belisário Ramos da Costa (Judge in Santa Catarina; son of Otacílio)

The Figueiredo family
Euclides Figueiredo (Federal Deputy for Rio de Janeiro)
João Figueiredo (President of Brazil, 1979–85; son of Euclides)

The Fonseca family
Deodoro da Fonseca (President of Brazil, 1889–91)
Hermes da Fonseca (President of Brazil, 1910–14; nephew of Deodoro da Fonseca)
Nair de Tefé (influential First Lady and political cartoonist; wife of Hermes da Fonseca)

The Geisel-Markus family
Augusto Frederico Markus (Mayor of Estrela, Rio Grande do Sul)
Ernesto Geisel (President of Brazil, 1974–79; son-in-law of Augusto)

The Genro family
Adelmo Genro (Vice-Mayor of Santa Maria)
Tarso Genro (Governor of Rio Grande do Sul; son of Adelmo)
Luciana Genro (Presidential candidate and Deputy for Rio Grande do Sul; daughter of Tarso)

The Goulart-Brizola family (brothers-in-law)
João Goulart (President of Brazil, 1961–64)
João Goulart Filho (State Deputy for Rio Grande do Sul and presidential candidate in 2018)
Leonel Brizola (Governor of Rio Grande do Sul and Rio de Janeiro State; brother-in-law of João)
José Vicente Goulart Brizola (Deputy for Rio Grande do Sul; son of Leonel and Neusa Goulart)
Carlos Daudt Brizola (Minister of Labour and Deputy for Rio Grande do Sul; grandson of Leonel)
Juliana Brizola (Deputy for Rio Grande do Sul; granddaughter of Leonel)
Leonel Brizola Neto (Deputy for Rio de Janeiro; grandson of Leonel and twin brother of Juliana)

The Kleinubing family
Waldemar Kleinübing, mayor of Videira, Santa Catarina 1966–70.
Vilson Pedro Kleinübing, Federal Deputy 1983–87, Mayor of Blumenau 1989–90, Governor of Santa Catarina 1991–94, Federal Senator 1995–98. Son of Waldemar.
João Paulo Kleinübing, State Deputy for Santa Catarina 2003–04, Mayor of Blumenau 2005–13, Secretary of Health of Santa Catarina 2015–16, Federal Deputy for Santa Catarina 2015–19. Son of Vilson.

The Kubitschek family
João Nepumuceno Kubitschek (Lieutenant Governor [vice-governor] of Minas Gerais)
Juscelino Kubitschek de Oliveira (President of Brazil, 1956–61)
Márcia Kubitschek (Lieutenant Governor of the Brazilian Federal District; daughter of Juscelino)
Maria Estela Kubitschek (candidate for Deputy Governor of Rio de Janeiro in 2006; daughter of Juscelino)
Jaime Gomes de Sousa Lemos (Federal Deputy; father-in-law of Juscelino)
Gabriel Passos (Federal Deputy; father-in-law of Juscelino)
Negrão de Lima (Governor of Guanabara; uncle of Juscelino's wife Sarah)
Octacílio Negrão de Lima (Cabinet member and Mayor of Belo Horizonte; uncle of Juscelino's wife Sarah)
João Antônio de Lemos (Deputy of the Empire; distant great-niece of Sarah)

The Lula da Silva family
Luiz Inácio Lula da Silva (President of Brazil, 2003–10)
Marcos Cláudio Lula da Silva (São Bernardo do Campo city councilor; step-son of Lula)

The Magalhães family
Francisco Peixoto de Magalhães (Deputy for Bahia)
Ângelo Magalhães (Deputy for Bahia; son of Francisco)
Paulo Magalhães (Deputy for Bahia; son of Ângelo)
Antônio Carlos Magalhães (Governor of Bahia; son of Francisco)
Antônio Carlos Magalhães Júnior (Senator for Bahia)
Antônio Carlos Magalhães Neto (former Mayor of Salvador)
Luís Eduardo Magalhães (Deputy for Bahia; son of Antônio Carlos)

The Malta-Ribeiro family
Manuel Gomes Ribeiro (Governor of Alagoas)
Euclides Vieira Malta (Governor of Alagoas; son-in-law of Manuel)

The Matarazzo-Suplicy family
Francesco Matarazzo (Count)
Ciccillo Matarazzo (Mayor of Ubatuba; nephew of Francesco)
Andrea Matarazzo (Alderman for São Paulo; grandson of Ciccillo)
Eduardo Matarazzo Suplicy (Senator for São Paulo state; great-grandson of Francesco)
Marta Suplicy (Mayor of São Paulo and Senator for São Paulo state; former wife of Eduardo)
Francisco Matarazzo (Deputy for São Paulo State)

The Neves-Cunha family
Tancredo Neves (President-elect of Brazil)
Tristão Ferreira da Cunha (Congressional Deputy from Minas Gerais)
Aécio Cunha (Congressional Deputy from Minas Gerais)
Aécio Neves da Cunha (former Governor of Minas Gerais)

The Quadros family
Jânio Quadros (President of Brazil 1961)
Dirce Tutu Quadros (Federal Deputy for São Paulo; daughter of Jânio)

The Ramos family
Vidal José de Oliveira Ramos Júnior (Senator and Governor of Santa Catarina)
Nereu Ramos (President of Brazil; son of Vidal)
Hugo de Oliveira Ramos (State Deputy; son of Vidal)
Celso Ramos (Governor of Santa Catarina; son of Vidal)
Mauro de Oliveira Ramos (Mayor of Florianópolis; son of Vidal)
Vidal Ramos Junior (Mayor of Lages; son of Vidal)
Belisário Ramos (Provincial Deputy; brother of Vidal)
Aristiliano Ramos (governor; Belisário's son)
Aristides Batista Ramos (Mayor of Florianópolis; Belisário's son)
Otacílio Vieira da Costa (State Deputy in Santa Catarina; Belisário's son-in-law; see the Costa family for details)
Cândido Ramos (governor; Vidal's nephew)
Saulo Ramos (senator; Vidal's nephew)

The Sarney family
Sarney de Araújo Costa (justice of the Court of Justice of Maranhão)
José Sarney (President of Brazil, 1985–90; son of Sarney)
Roseana Sarney (former Governor and Senator from Maranhão; daughter of José)
Sarney Filho (State and Federal Deputy from Maranhão; son of José)
Roberto Macieira (Mayor of São Luís, Maranhão; brother-in-law of Jose)

The Vargas-Peixoto family
Getúlio Vargas (President of Brazil, 1930–45 and 1951–54)
Lutero Vargas (Congressional Deputy from Rio de Janeiro)
Alzira Vargas do Amaral Peixoto (lawyer, Presidential advisor and author)
Ernani do Amaral Peixoto (Governor of Rio de Janeiro State)
Ivete Vargas Tatsch (Congressional Deputy from São Paulo State)

Bulgaria

The Bogoridi family
Sophronius of Vratsa (one of the leading figures of the Bulgarian National Revival)
Stefan Bogoridi (Governor of the island of Samos, Caimacam of Moldavia)
Nicola Bogoridi (Caimacam of Moldavia)
Alexander Bogoridi (Governor-General of Eastern Rumelia)

The Bokov family
Georgi Bokov (former Communist leader, former media boss)
Filip Bokov (former Socialist leader, Member of Parliament, Presidential advisor)
Georgi Bokov (1972–2001), son of Filip Bokov, auto thief and criminal, 
Biliana Bokova (d. 2001), daughter of Filip Bokov
Irina Bokova (former Foreign Minister, ran for vice-president, Member of Parliament, Ambassador to France)

The Mihaylovski family
Ilarion Makariopolski (one of the leaders of the struggle for an autonomous Bulgarian church)
Nikola Mihaylovski (one of the leaders of the struggle for an autonomous Bulgarian church)
Stoyan Mihaylovski (Member of Parliament)
Hristo Mihaylovski (former Deputy Minister)

The Shishmanov family
Alexander Shishmanov (Mayor of Svishtov)
Asen Shishmanov (Member of Parliament)
Ivan Shishmanov (former Minister, Ambassador to Ukraine)
Dimitar Shishmanov (former Foreign Minister)

The Slaveykov family
Petko Slaveykov (Chairman of the Parliament)
Ivan Slaveykov (Member of Parliament, Minister, Mayor of Sofia)
Hristo Slaveykov (Chairman of the Parliament)

The Staliyski family
Aleksandar Tsankov Staliyski (former Justice Minister)
Aleksandar Aleksandrov Staliyski (former Defence Minister)

The Stanishev family (father-son)
Dimitar Stanishev (member of the Politburo of the Bulgarian Communist Party)
Sergei Stanishev (Prime Minister of Bulgaria, 2005–09)

The Zhivkov family
Todor Zhivkov (General Secretary of the Bulgarian Communist Party, 1954–89)
Lyudmila Zhivkova (former Culture minister; daughter of Todor Zhivkov)
Jenny Zhivkova (Member of Parliament; granddaughter of Todor Zhivkov)

Burkina Faso
The Compaoré family
Blaise Compaoré (President of Burkina Faso, 1987–present)
François Compaoré (economic advisor; brother of Blaise Compaoré)
Simon Compaoré (Mayor of Ouagadougou)
Jean-Marie Compaoré (Archbishop of Burkina Faso)
Jean-Baptiste Compaoré (Finance minister)
Franck Compaoré
Chantal Compaoré (First Lady; wife of Blaise Compaoré)
Félix Houphouët-Boigny (former President of Côte d'Ivoire; father of Chantal Compaoré)

The Yaméogo family (father-son)
Maurice Yaméogo (President of Burkina Faso, 1959–66)
Hermann Yaméogo (Presidential candidate)

The Zerbo-Yonli family
Saye Zerbo (President of Burkina Faso, 1980–82)
Paramanga Ernest Yonli (Prime Minister of Burkina Faso, 2000–07; son-in-law)

Burma
The Aung San family (parents-daughter)
Aung San (pre-independence prime minister)
Khin Kyi (ambassador)
Aung San Suu Kyi (democracy activist, Minister of Foreign Affairs, State of Counsellor)

The Win family (father-daughter)
Ne Win, military dictator
Sandar Win, politician

Burundi
The Bagaza-Buyoya family
Jean-Baptiste Bagaza (President, 1976–87)
Pierre Buyoya (President, 1987–93 and 1996–2003)

Cambodia
The Hun family
Hun Sen, Prime Minister of Cambodia
Hun Manet, Lieutenant-general in the Royal Cambodian Armed Forces
Hun Manith, Brigadier-general in the Royal Cambodian Armed Forces
Hun Many, Member of Parliament for Kampong Speu Province

Canada

Central African Republic
The Boganda family–Dacko family–Domitien family and Bokassa family (distant relatives)
Barthélemy Boganda, "founding father"
David Dacko, first leader of independent CAR
Elisabeth Domitien, prime minister and cousin of Bokassa
Jean-Bédel Bokassa, Cold War-era despot and erstwhile "emperor"
Jean-Serge Bokassa, Minister of Youth, Sports, Arts, and Culture (2011–13), Minister of the Interior (2016– )

The Kolingba family
André Kolingba (President of the Central African Republic, 1981–93)
Désiré Kolingba (presidential candidate)
Mireille Kolingba (wife of André Kolingba; Member of Parliament)

Chile
The Alessandri family
 Jose Pedro Alessandri Palma Senator
 Gustavo Alessandri Valdés four times Deputy, Mayor of Santiago and La Florida, council man. 
 Gustavo Alessandri Balmaceda Deputy 1990–94
 Gustavo Alessandri Bascuñan Councilman 2012–16, Mayor of Zapallar 2016–
 Felipe Alessandri Vergara Councilman 2004–08, 2012–16, Mayor of Santiago 2016–
 Arturo Alessandri Palma, President of Chile, 1920–24, 1925, 1932–38
Jorge Alessandri, President of Chile, 1958–64
Fernando Alessandri, President of the Senate of Chile, 1950–58
 Arturo Alessandri Besa Deputy, Senator

The Allende family
Salvador Allende Gossens, President of Chile 1970–73
Isabel Allende Bussi, Deputy 1993–2007, Senator 2010–
Maya Fernández Allende Deputy 2018–22, Minister of Defese 2022– 
Laura Allende Gossens, Deputy 1965–73

The Aylwin family
Patricio Aylwin – President of Chile, 1990–94
Mariana Aylwin – Minister of Education, 2000–03

The Errázuriz family
Federico Errázuriz Zañartu, President of Chile
Federico Errázuriz Echaurren, President of Chile
Francisco Javier Errázuriz Talavera, Senator 1994–2002
Hernán Felipe Errázuriz Correa, Foreign Minister of Chile

The Frei family
Eduardo Frei Montalva – President of Chile, 1964–70
Eduardo Frei Ruiz-Tagle – President of Chile, 1994–2000 (son of Eduardo Frei Montalva)
Carmen Frei Ruiz-Tagle – Senator, 1990–2006
Arturo Frei Bolivar – Deputy, 1969–73, Senator, 1989–98

The Girardi family
Treviso Girardi – Mayor of Quinta Normal
Guido Girardi Brière – Deputy, 2006–2010
Guido Girardi – Deputy 1994–2006, Senator 2006–present 
Cristina Girardi – Mayor of Cerro Navia, 1996–2008, Deputy 2010–present 
Dino Girardi – Councillor of Lo Prado

The Lagos family
Ricardo Lagos Escobar, President of Chile, 2000–06
Ricardo Lagos Weber, Minister Secretary General of Government of Chile, 2006–07

The Letelier family
Orlando Letelier del Solar, Minister of Foreign Affairs, Interior and Defence, 1973
Juan Pablo Letelier, Deputy 1990–2006, Senator 2006–07

The Montt family
Manuel Montt Torres, President of Chile
Jorge Montt Alvarez, President of Chile
Pedro Montt Montt, President of Chile

The Piñera family
Sebastián Piñera, President of Chile 
José Piñera, Minister of Labor and Social Security, minister of Mining
Pablo Piñera, Chilean ambassador to Argentina
Andrés Chadwick, Minister of Interior and Public Security

The Pinochet family
Augusto Pinochet, President of Chile
Lucía Pinochet, Congresswoman of Vitacura

The Pinto family
Francisco Antonio Pinto Díaz, President of Chile
Aníbal Pinto Garmendia, President of Chile

Republic of China
The Chang family
 (Yunlin County Magistrate, 1999–2005)
 (legislator, 2008–2016) (daughter)
Chang Li-shan (legislator, 2005–2008, 2016–2018; Yunlin County Magistrate, 2018–) (sister)

The Chiang family (father-sons-grandson-great-grandson)
Chiang Kai-shek (President of the Republic of China, 1928–32; 1943–49; 1950–75; Premier of the Republic of China, 1930–31; 1935–38; 1939–45; 1947; Leader of the Kuomintang, 1926–75)
Chiang Ching-kuo (Premier of the Republic of China, 1972–78; President of the Republic of China, 1978–88; Chairman of the Kuomintang, 1975–88)
Chiang Hsiao-wu (ROC Representative to Japan, 1990–91)
Chiang Hsiao-yung (former member of the Kuomintang Central Committee)
John Chiang (foreign minister, 1996–97; vice premier of the ROC, 1997; secretary-general; legislator, 2002–2012)
Chiang Wan-an (legislator, 2016–2022; Mayor of Taipei, 2022–)
Chiang Wei-kuo (Secretary-General of Kuomintang)

The Chen family (Chen Hsin-an) (father-son)
 Kaohsiung County magistrate (1954–57)
Chen Chien-jen (son): Minister of the Department of Health (2003–05), Minister of the National Science Council (2006–08), Vice President of the Republic of China (2016–20)

The Chen family (Chen Qimei)
Chen Qimei
Chen Guofu (nephew)
Chen Lifu (nephew)

The Chen family (Chen Shui-bian)
Chen Shui-bian: Member of Taipei City Council (1981–85); Legislative Yuan member (1990–94); Mayor of Taipei (1994–98); President of the Republic of China (2000–08)
Wu Shu-chen (wife): Legislative Yuan member (1987–90)
Chen Chih-chung (son): Kaohsiung city councilor (2010–11, 2018–)

The Chiu family (Chiou Lien-hui)
Chiou Lien-hui: Pingtung County Councilor (1968–71), Taiwan Provincial Councilor (1973–81), Pingtung County Magistrate (1981–85), member of the Legislative Yuan (1987–1996)
 Chiu Tzu-cheng (son): National Assembly member
Chiu Feng-kuang (nephew): Director of the National Immigration Agency (2018–2021)
 Lee Shih-pin: Pingtung county councillor (2002-)

The Chiu family (Chiu Ching-te)
Chiu Ching-te: Pingtung County Assemblyman and Mayor of Pingtung City
  (son): Pingtung County Councilor (1968–77) Taiwan Provincial Councilor (1989–98)
 Chiu Yi-ying (granddaughter): Member of the National Assembly (1996–2000), Legislative Yuan (2002–05; 2008–)
 Lee Yung-te (husband of Chiu Yi-ying): Minister of the Hakka Affairs Council (2005–08; 2016–)
 (grandson): Pingtung County Councilor (2006–14)

The Chou family
Chou Wu-liu: Legislative Yuan member (1999–2002)
Chou Chen Hsiu-hsia: Legislative Yuan member (2016–20)

The Fu family
Fu Kun-chi: Legislative Yuan member (2002–09; 2020–); Hualien County magistrate (2009–2018)
Hsu Chen-wei: Hualien County magistrate (2018–) 

The Hau family
Hau Pei-tsun: Commander-in-Chief of the Republic of China Army (1978–81); Chief of the General Staff of the Republic of China Armed Forces (1981–89); Ministry of National Defense (1989–90); Premier (1990–93)
Hau Lung-pin (son): Legislative Yuan member (1996–2001); Minister of the Environmental Protection Administration of the Executive Yuan (2001–03); Mayor of Taipei (2006–14); Vice Chairman of Kuomintang (2014–)

The Hsu family (mother–daughters of Chiayi)
Hsu Shih-hsien: Taiwan Provincial councilor (1957–68); Legislative Yuan member (1973–81); Mayor of Chiayi City (1968–72, 1982–83)
 (daughter): National Assembly member (1987–93); Mayor of Chiayi City (1989–97)
Chang Po-ya (daughter): Mayor of Chiayi City (1983–89, 1997–2000); Minister of the Department of Health (1990–97); Legislative Yuan member (1990); Minister of the Interior (2000–02); Chairwoman, Taiwan Provincial Government (2000–02); President of the Control Yuan (2014–2020)

The Hsu family (brothers of Taoyuan)
Hsu Hsin-liang, Taoyuan County Magistrate (1977–79)
Hsu Chung Pi-hsia (wife), member of the Legislative Yuan (1999–2002)
Hsu Kuo-tai, member of the Legislative Yuan (1987–1996)

The Hsu–Wu family
Hsu Sheng-fa, (father-in-law of Eugene Wu) member of the Legislative Yuan (1981–1990)
Eric Wu (brother of Eugene Wu) member of the Legislative Yuan (1993–1996; 2002–2005), member of the National Assembly (1996–2000)
Cynthia Wu (daughter of Eugene Wu) member of the Legislative Yuan (2022–) 

The Huang family 
Huang Hsin-chieh Legislative Yuan member (1969–91)
Huang Tien-fu (brother): Legislative Yuan member (1981–84; 96–99)
Lan Mei-chin (sister-in-law): Taipei City Councilor (1985–2002) Legislative Yuan member (2002–08)

The Kao family
Kao Tsu-min, member of the Legislative Yuan (1990–1993)
Yang Fu-mei (wife), member of the Legislative Yuan (2002–2005)

The Ku family (brothers) 
: military leadership
Ku Cheng-kang: Minister of the Interior (1950)
Ku Cheng-ting: Legislative Yuan member (elected 1948)
Pi Yi-shu (wife of Ku Cheng-ting): Legislative Yuan member (elected 1948)

The Lee family (Lee Huan)
Lee Huan Premier of the Republic of China (1989–90)
Lee Ching-hua (son): Member of the Legislative Yuan (1993–2016)
Diane Lee (daughter): Member of the Legislative Yuan (1999–2009)

The Lee-Han family
 Lee Jih-kuei: Yunlin County Councilor (1985–1997)
Lee Chia-fen (daughter): Yunlin County Councilor (1997–2009)
Han Kuo-yu (son-in-law): Taipei County Councilor (1990–93) Legislative Yuan member (1993–2002) Mayor of Kaohsiung (2018–2020)
 Lee Ming-che (son): Yunlin County Councilor (2009–)

The Lien family
Lien Chen-tung: Acting Taipei County magistrate (1946–47); National Assembly member (1947–86); Taiwan Provincial Government secretary general (1957); Minister of the Interior (1960–66)
Lien Chan (son): Minister of Transportation and Communications (1981–87); Minister of Foreign Affairs (1988–90); Vice Premier (1987–88); Chairman, Taiwan Provincial Government (1990–93); Premier (1993–97); Vice President (1996–2000); Chairman, Kuomintang (2000–05)
Sean Lien (grandson): Candidate for Mayor of Taipei

Ni–Kuo-Liu family 
Ni Wen-ya, Member of the National Assembly (1946–1948), Legislative Yuan (1948–1991) Vice President of the Legislative Yuan (1961–1972), President of the Legislative Yuan (1972–1988)
Shirley Kuo (wife), Minister of Finance (1988–1990) and the Council for Economic Planning and Development (1990–1993)
Christina Liu (biological daughter of Kuo), member of the Legislative Yuan (2002–2007), minister of the Council for Economic Planning and Development (2010–2012) and Finance (2012)

The Soong family  (father-son-3 daughters)
Charlie Soong: anti-Qing dynasty activist; financier of Sun Yat-sen
T. V. Soong: Governor of the Bank of China; Minister of Finance; Minister of Foreign Affairs; legislator; Premier
Soong Ai-ling (a.k.a. Madame H. H. Kung): secretary to President Sun Yat-sen
Soong Ching-ling (a.k.a. Madame Sun Yat-sen): Vice President of the People's Republic of China; Honorary President of the People's Republic of China
Soong Mei-ling (a.k.a. Madame Chiang Kai-shek): legislator, Cabinet Minister (Air Force)

The Su family (Su Jia-chyuan)
Su Jia-chyuan: Pingtung County magistrate (1997–2004); Minister of the Interior (2004–06); Minister of the Council of Agriculture (2006–08); President of the Legislative Yuan (2016–20)
Su Chia-fu (brother): Legislative Yuan member (2004–2005)
Su Chen-ching (nephew): Legislative Yuan member (2008–)

The Su family (Su Tong-chi)
Su Tong-chi: Yunlin County councilor
Su Hong Yueh-chiao (wife): Yunlin County councilor; Taiwan Provincial councillor
Su Chih-yang (daughter): Taiwan Provincial councilor; National Assembly member
Su Chih-fen (daughter): National Assembly member (1996–2000); Legislative Yuan member (2002–2005, 2016–), Yunlin County Magistrate (2005–14)

The Su family (Su Tseng-chang)
Su Tseng-chang: Pingtung County magistrate (1989–93); Taipei County magistrate (1997–2004); Premier (2006–07, 2019–)
Su Chiao-hui (daughter): Legislative Yuan member (2016–)

The Tan–Chen family (Chen Cheng)
Tan Zhonglin, Qing dynasty minister
Tan Yankai (son), Premier of the Republic of China (1928–30)
  (granddaughter), Second Lady of the Republic of China (1954–65, while married to Chen Cheng)
Chen Cheng (husband of Tan Hsiang): Chief of the General Staff of the Republic of China Armed Forces (1946–48); Chairman of Taiwan Provincial Government (1949);Premier (1950–54；1958–63); Vice President of the Republic of China (1954–65)
Chen Li-an (great-grandson): Minister of Economic Affairs (1988–90); Ministry of National Defense (1990–93)；President of Control Yuan (1993–1995)

The Wu family
Wu Hung-sen (elder brother): Taiwan Provincial Senate member (1946–51)
Wu Hung-lin (younger brother): Taoyuan County councilor (1953–60, speaker: 1953–55); Taoyuan County Magistrate (1960–64)
Wu Po-hsiung (son): Taoyuan County Magistrate (1973–76); Mayor of Taipei (1988–90); Minister of the Interior (1984–88, 1991–94); Secretary General, Office of the President (1994–96); Secretary General, Kuomintang (1996–97); Chairman, Kuomintang (2007–09)
John Wu (grandson): Legislative Yuan member (2005–09, 2016–); Taoyuan County Magistrate (2009–14); Commissioner, Chinese Professional Baseball League (2015–)
Wu Chih-kang (grandson): Taipei City Council member (2006–)

The Yu family (Kaohsiung County Black Faction)
Yu Teng-fa: Mayor, Ch'iao-t'ou Township; National Assembly member (1947–73); Kaohsiung County magistrate (1960–63)
Yu Chen Yueh-ying (daughter-in-law): Taiwan Provincial councilor (1972–81); Legislative Yuan member (1984–85); Kaohsiung County magistrate (1985–93)
Yu Lin-ya (granddaughter): Taiwan Provincial councilor (1982–93); Legislative Yuan member (1993–99)
Yu Cheng-hsien (grandson): Legislative Yuan member (1987–93); Kaohsiung County magistrate (1993–2001); Minister of the Interior (2002–04)
Cheng Kuei-lien (granddaughter-in-law): National Assembly member (1996–2000, 05); Legislative Yuan member (2002–05)
Yu Jane-daw (grandson): Taiwan provincial councilor (1994–99); Legislative Yuan member (1999–2012)
Huang Yu Hsiu-luan (daughter): Legislative Yuan member (1981–84)
Huang Yu-jen (son-in-law): Kaohsiung County magistrate (1977–81)

Mongolian
Gungsangnorbu (father), prince of the Right Harqin Banner, director of the Mongolian and Tibetan Affairs Commission for the Beiyang Government
Wu Jingbin (daughter) Legislative Yuan member (1948–1963), secretary-general of the Xinjiang Uyghur Autonomous Region Chinese People's Political Consultative Conference

People's Republic of China

The Bo family
Bo Yibo: Minister of Finance of China 1949–53, Vice Premier of China 1956–75, Vice Chairman of the Central Advisory Commission 1982–92
Bo Xilai (son): Governor of Liaoning 2003–04, Minister of Commerce of the PRC 2004–07, Chongqing Party Committee Secretary 2007–12

The Deng family
Deng Xiaoping: Paramount leader of China and Communist Party 1978–89
Zhuo Lin (wife): Consultant to the General Office of the Central Military Committee
Deng Pufang (son): Vice Chairperson of the CPPCC and Chairman of the China Disabled Persons Federation
Deng Nan (daughter): Vice Minister of the State Science and Technology Commission 1998–2004
Deng Rong (daughter): Deputy President of the China Association for International Friendly Contact 1990–present
Deng Zhuodi (grandson): Sub-prefect of Pingguo County, Guangxi Zhuang Autonomous Region

The Hu family
Hu Jintao: Chinese paramount leader and General Secretary of the Chinese Communist Party 2002–12
Hu Haifeng (son): Party Committee Secretary of Lishui

The Li family
Li Xiannian: President of the People's Republic of China 1983–88, Chairperson of the Chinese People's Political Consultative Conference 1988–92
Lin Jiamei (wife): President of the Chinese Association for Female Doctors 2015–present
Li Xiaolin (daughter): Chairperson of the Chinese People's Association for Friendship with Foreign Countries 2011–present
Liu Yazhou (son-in-law): General of the People's Liberation Army Air Force

The Liu family
Liu Shaoqi: Chairman of the Standing Committee of the National People's Congress 1954–59; President of the People's Republic of China 1959–68
Wang Guangmei (wife): Member of the National Chinese People's Political Consultative Conference
Liu Yuan (son): Vice mayor of Zhengzhou and Political commissar of the General Logistics Department and Political commissar of the PLA Academy of Military Science and member of the 17th and the 18th Central Committee of the Chinese Communist Party
Liu Ting (daughter): Chairperson and President of the Asia Link Group, consultants in corporate finance

The Mao family
Mao Zedong: Paramount leader of China and Chairman of the Chinese Communist Party 1949–76
Jiang Qing (Madame Mao): deputy leader of the Central Cultural Revolution Group and member of Politburo of the Chinese Communist Party
Mao Anqing (son): researcher at the Academy of Military Sciences and the Publicity Department of the Central Committee of the Chinese Communist Party
Shao Hua (daughter-in-law): member of the National Committee of the Chinese People's Political Consultative Conference
Li Min (daughter): member of the 10th National Congress of the Chinese People's Political Consultative Conference
Li Na (daughter of Mao Zedong): member of the 10th National Congress of the Chinese Communist Party in 1973, and the Party Chief of CPC Pinggu County Committee and Deputy Secretary of CPC Beijing Committee 1974–75
Mao Xinyu (grandson): member of the Chinese National Committee of the Chinese People's Political Consultative Conference
Mao Yuanxin (nephew): member of Central Committee, party secretary of Liaoning and political commissar of Shenyang Military Region

The Xi family
Xi Zhongxun: First Vice Chairman of the Standing Committee of the National People's Congress 1988–93
Xi Jinping (son): General Secretary of the Chinese Communist Party 2012–present, President of the People's Republic of China) 2013–present

The Zeng family
Zeng Shan: Interior Minister of China, Minister of Commerce of China
Zeng Qinghong (son): Politburo Standing Committee member 2002–07, Vice President of China 2003–08

The Zhou family
Zhou Enlai: Premier of the People's Republic of China 1949–76 and Vice Chairman of the Chinese Communist Party and Foreign Minister of the PRC 
Deng Yingchao (wife): Chairwoman of the National Committee of the Chinese People's Political Consultative Conference and Second Secretary of the Central Commission for Discipline Inspection

Colombia
The Araújo family
Consuelo Araújo: Culture minister
Hernando Molina Araújo: Governor of Cesar Department, son of Consuelo Araujo
Álvaro Araújo Castro; senator, nephew of Consuelo Araujo
María Consuelo Araújo: Foreign minister, sister of Alvaro Araujo

The Barco family (father-daughter)
Virgilio Barco Vargas: President
Carolina Barco: Foreign Minister

The Lleras-Restrepo family
Lorenzo María Lleras: Foreign minister
Sergio Camargo: President of Colombia
Alberto Lleras Camargo: President of Colombia, grandson of Lorenzo María Lleras
Carlos Lleras Restrepo: President of Colombia, great grandson of Lorenzo María Lleras
Carlos Lleras de la Fuente: Ambassador to the US, son of Carlos Lleras Restrepo
Germán Vargas Lleras: President of the Senate, grandson of Carlos Lleras Restrepo

The López family
Ambrosio López: popular leader during the middle of s. XIX
Pedro A. López: entrepreneur and Minister, son of Ambrosio López
Alfonso López Pumarejo: son of Pedro, President of Colombia (1934–38 and 1942–45).
Alfonso López Michelsen: son of Alfonso, President of Colombia (1974–78)
Alfonso López Caballero: son of López Michelsen, Ambassador, Minister of the Interior.
María Mercedes Cuéllar López: cousin of López Caballero, Minister of Economic Development.
Clara López Obregón: cousin of María Mercedes, President of the Alternative Democratic Pole Party.

The Pastrana family (father-son)
Misael Pastrana Borrero, President of Colombia
Andrés Pastrana Arango, President of Colombia

The Santos family
María Antonia Santos Plata: Martyr of the Colombian Independence.
Eduardo Santos Montejo: President of Colombia (1938–42), grandnephew of Antonia.
Francisco Santos Calderón: Vice President of Colombia (2002–10), grandnephew of Eduardo.
Juan Manuel Santos Calderón: President of Colombia (2010–present), Minister of Defense (2006–10), former Minister of Foreign Trade (1991–94), and of Finance (2000–02), grandnephew of Eduardo, first cousin on both sides to Francisco.

Comoros
The Ahmed family (grandfather-grandson)
Hashimu bin Ahmed
Said Hassane Said Hachim

The Said family
Said Mohamed Jaffar
Said Atthoumani
Said Mohamed Cheikh
Athoumane Said Ahmed
Saidi Ali bin Saidi Omar
Said Ibrahim Ben Ali
Said Ali Kemal

The Soilih family (half-brothers)
Ali Soilih, President of Comoros
Said Mohamed Djohar, President of Comoros

Democratic Republic of the Congo
Kabila family (father-children)
Laurent-Désiré Kabila (President, 1997–2001)
Joseph Kabila (President, 2001–)
Jaynet Kabila (Member of the National Assembly, 2011–)

Kanza family (father-children)
Daniel Kanza (Bourgmestre of Léopoldville, 1960–62, and Vice-President of the ABAKO)
Sophie Lihau-Kanza (Secretary of State for Social Affairs, 1966–67, Minister of Social Affairs, 1967–68, Minister of State for Social Affairs, 1969–70)
Thomas Kanza (Ambassador of the Republic of the Congo to the United Kingdom, 1962–63, Minister of International Cooperation, 1997, Minister of Labour, 1998, Ambassador of the Democratic Republic of the Congo to Scandinavian Countries, 1999–2004)
Philippe Kanza (editor of the newspaper Congo)

Mobutu family (father-son)
Mobutu Sese Seko (President, 1965–97)
Nzanga Mobutu (Deputy Prime Minister, 2008–11, leader of the Union of Mobutist Democrats)

Tshombe-Nguza family (uncle-nephew)
Moise Tshombe (Prime Minister, 1964–65)
Jean Nguza Karl-i-Bond (Prime Minister, 1980–81, 1991–92)

Cook Islands
The Henry family
Albert Henry, Chief Minister
Sir Geoffrey Henry, Chief Minister

Costa Rica
The Arias-Sánchez brothers
Óscar Arias Sánchez (President of Costa Rica, 1986–90, 2006–10)
Rodrigo Arias Sánchez (Presidential Chief of Staff)

The Calderón family
Rafael Ángel Calderón Muñoz (Vice President of Costa Rica)
Rafael Ángel Calderón Guardia (son of Rafael Ángel Calderón Muñoz; President of Costa Rica, 1940–44)
Rafael Ángel Calderón Fournier (son of Rafael Ángel Calderón Guardia; President of Costa Rica, 1990–94)
Francisco Calderón Guardia (son of Rafael Ángel Calderón Muñoz; Vice President of Costa Rica)

The Figueres family (father-son)
José Figueres Ferrer (President of Costa Rica, 1953–58 and 1970–74)
José María Figueres Olsen (President of Costa Rica, 1994–98)

The Jiménez family (father-son)
Jesús Jiménez Zamora (President of Costa Rica, 1863–66 and 1868–70)
Ricardo Jiménez Oreamuno (President of Costa Rica, 1910–14, 1924–28 and 1932–36)

The Monge family (uncle-nephew)
Luis Alberto Monge (President of Costa Rica, 1982–86)
Rolando Araya Monge (Transportation minister)

Croatia
The Tuđman family
Franjo Tuđman (President of Croatia, 1991–99)
Miroslav Tuđman (son of Franjo Tuđman; leader of Croatian True Revival)

Cuba
The Castro family
Fidel Castro (Prime Minister of Cuba, 1959–2008; President of Cuba, 1976–2008; First Secretary, 1965–2011)
Raúl Castro (brother of Fidel Castro; second secretary, Communist Party of Cuba, 1965–2011; First Secretary, Communist Party of Cuba, 2011–present)
Vilma Espín Guillois wife of Raúl Castro and member of the Council of State of Cuba.
Mariela Castro daughter of Raúl Castro and Vilma Espín. Director of the Cuban National Center for Sex Education.
Alejandro Castro Espín son of Raúl Castro and Vilma Espín. Colonel of the Ministry of Interior of Cuba.

Cyprus
Clerides family (father-daughter)
Glafcos Clerides (President of Cyprus, 1974, 1993–2003)
Katherine Clerides (Member of the Parliament of Cyprus, 2006–)

Kyprianou family (father-son)
Spyros Kyprianou (President of Cyprus, 1977–88)
Markos Kyprianou (Foreign Minister, 2008–11)

Papadopoulos family (father-son)
Tassos Papadopoulos (President of Cyprus, 2003–08)
Nicolas Papadopoulos (Member of the Parliament of Cyprus, 2006–)

Vasiliou family (husband-wife)
George Vasiliou (President of Cyprus, 1988–93)
Androulla Vassiliou (European commissioner, 2008–)

Czechoslovakia/Czechia
The Benda family
Václav Benda (Member of the Federal Assembly, 1989–92; Senator, 1996–99)
Marek Benda (son of Václav Benda; Member of the Czech National Council, 1990–92; Member of the Chamber of Deputies, 1993–2002, 2004–)

The Dienstbier family
Jiří Dienstbier (Minister of Foreign Affairs 1989–92; Senator 2008–11)
Jiří Dienstbier Jr. (son of Jiří Dienstbier, Minister for Human Rights and Equal Opportunities, 2014–16, Member of the Chamber of Deputies, 2011; Senator, 2011–)

The Klaus family
Václav Klaus (President of the Czech Republic, 2003–13)
Václav Klaus Jr. (son of Václav Klaus; Member of the Chamber of Deputies, 2017–)

The Masaryk family
Tomáš Masaryk (President of Czechoslovakia, 1918–35)
Jan Masaryk (son of Tomáš Masaryk; Minister of Foreign Affairs, 1940–48)

Denmark
The Auken family
Svend Auken (Member of The Folketing (The Danish Parliament) 1971–2009, Minister of Labor 1977–82 and Minister of Environment 1993–2001)
Gunvor Auken (Deputy Mayor of Frederiksberg 1998–2002)
Margrete Auken (Member of The Folketing (The Danish Parliament) 1979–90 and again from 1994 to 2004, Member of the European Parliament from 2004–)
Ida Auken (daughter of Margrethe Auken; Member of The Folketing (The Danish Parliament) 2007–)

The Ellemann-Jensen family
Jens Peter Jensen (Member of The Folketing 1964–73, 1975–81, 1984–87 and 1988–90 and Deputy County Mayor of Fyn 1970–79)
Uffe Ellemann-Jensen (son of Jens Peter Jensen; Member of The Folketing 1977–2001, Foreign Minister 1982–93)
Karen Ellemann (daughter of Uffe Ellemann-Jensen; City Council Member of Rudersdal 2005–07, Member of The Folketing 2007–, Minister of the Interior 2009–10, Minister for the Environment 2010–11)
Jakob Ellemann-Jensen (son of Uffe Ellemann-Jensen; Member of The Folketing 2011–, Minister for Environment and Food 2018–19)

The Helveg Petersen family
Kristen Helveg Petersen (Minister of Education 1961–64, Member of The Folketing 1964–75 and Member of the European Parliament 1973–75)
Lilly Helveg Petersen (wife of Kristen HP; Deputy Mayor of Copenhagen)
Niels Helveg Petersen (son of Kristen and Lilly Helveg Petersen; Member of The Folketing 1966–74 and 1977–, Minister of Trade 1988–1990 and Foreign Minister 1993–2000)
Kirsten Lee (wife of Niels Helveg Petersen; Member of The Folketing 1987–90, and Regional Council Member 2005–)
Morten Helveg Petersen (son of Niels Helveg Petersen; Member of The Folketing 1998–2009)
Rasmus Helveg Petersen (son of Niels Helveg Petersen; Member of The Folketing 2011–, Minister for Development Cooperation 2013–)

The Hækkerup family
Hans Kristen Hækkerup (Member of The Folketing (The Danish Parliament), 1920–29, and Mayor of Ringsted, 1927–29)
Hans Erling Hækkerup (son of Hans Kristen Hækkerup; Minister of Justice and later Minister of the Interior, 1953–68, Member of the Folketinget 1945–47 and 1948–71)
Per Hækkerup (son of Hans Kristen Hækkerup; Foreign Minister, Minister of Trade and Industry 1962–79)
Karen Margrete Hækkerup (wife of Per Hækkerup, Member of The Folketing 1964–66 and 1970–81)
Hans Hækkerup (son of Per Hækkerup, Minister of Defence 1993–2000, Member of The Folketing)
Lise Ingeborg Hækkerup (ex-wife of Hans Hækkerup, Member of The Folketing 1990–94, 1998–2001 and a bit of 2004)
Klaus Hækkerup (son of Per Hækkerup, Mayor of Frederiksværk 1978–88, Member of The Folketing 1988–)
Nick Hækkerup (son of Klaus Hækkerup, Mayor of Hillerød 2000–07, Member of the Folketing 2007–)
Ole Hækkerup (son of Klaus Hækkerup, Member of The Folketing 1998–2001)
Karen Angelo Hækkerup (wife of Ole Hækkerup, Member of The Folketing 2005–)

Djibouti
The Aptidon-Guelleh family
Hassan Gouled Aptidon (President of Djibouti, 1977–99)
Ismail Omar Guelleh (nephew of Hassan Gouled Aptidon; President of Djibouti, 1999– )

Dominica
The Boyd family
Philip Ivor Boyd (first Mayor of Roseau)
Cynthia Boyd Butler (Mayor of Roseau and daughter of Philip Ivor Boyd)
Jacob Allison Stewart- Boyd (Member of Legislative Council and Minister of Works under the F. Baron administration)
Alix Boyd Knight (Longest running and current Speaker of the House)
Dr. Phillip Irving Boyd Public Health figure and first Head of the Cari-com Health Desk
Stanley Boyd Activist and conservationist (1948–2003), Writer, Inter isle Tennis Champ, editor of The Dominica Chronicle Newspaper (after Stewart) 
The Douglas family
R. B. D. Douglas (Member of Parliament for Portsmouth)
Adenauer "Washway" Douglas (son of R. B. D. Douglas; Mayor of Portsmouth)
Michael Douglas (son of R. B. D. Douglas; Member of Parliament for Portsmouth)
Ian Douglas (son of Michael Douglas; Member of Parliament for Portsmouth)
Rosie Douglas (son of R. B. D. Douglas; Prime Minister of Dominica, 2000)

Dominican Republic 
The Báez family
Pablo Altagracia Báez (Mayor of Azua)
 Buenaventura Báez (President of the Dominican Republic, 1849–53, 1856–58, 1865–66, 1868–74, 1876–78)
 Altagracia Amelia Báez
 José María Cabral y Báez
 Auristela Cabral Bermúdez
 Donald Reid Cabral (President of the Dominican Republic, 1963–65)
 Mario Fermín Cabral y Báez (President of the Senate of the Dominican Republic, 1914–16, 1930–38, 1955)
 Manuel del Cabral
 Peggy Cabral (vice-mayor of Distrito Nacional, 1998–2002; Head of Dominican Revolutionary Party, 2013–)
 Ramón Báez (President of the Dominican Republic, 1914)

The Bosch family
 Juan Bosch (President of the Dominican Republic, 1963)
 Milagros Ortiz Bosch (niece of Juan Bosch; Vice President of the Dominican Republic, 2000–04)

The Cabral family
 José María Cabral (President of the Dominican Republic, 1865, 1866–68)
 Marcos Antonio Cabral
 José María Cabral y Báez
 Auristela Cabral Bermúdez
 Donald Reid Cabral (President of the Dominican Republic, 1963–65)
 Mario Fermín Cabral y Báez (President of the Senate of the Dominican Republic, 1914–16, 1930–1938, 1955)
 Manuel del Cabral
 Peggy Cabral (vice-mayor of Distrito Nacional, 1998–2002; Head of Dominican Revolutionary Party, 2013–)

The Fernández family
 Leonel Fernández Reyna (President of the Dominican Republic, 1996–2000 and 2004–12)
 Margarita Cedeño de Fernández (wife of Leonel Fernandez; Vice President of the Dominican Republic, 2012–present)

The Guillermo family
 Pedro Guillermo y Guerrero (President of the Dominican Republic, 1865)
 Cesáreo Guillermo y Bastardo (President of the Dominican Republic, 1878 and 1879)

The Jimenes family
 Manuel Jimenes (President of the Dominican Republic, 1848–49)
 Juan Isidro Jimenes Pereyra (son of Manuel Jimenes; President of the Dominican Republic, 1899–1902 and 1914–16)

The Medina family
 Danilo Medina (President of the Chamber of Deputies, 1994–95; President of the Dominican Republic, 2012–present)
 Lucía Medina (Vice President of the Chamber of Deputies, 2006–16; President of the Chamber of Deputies, 2016–present)

The Trujillo family
 Rafael Leónidas Trujillo (President of the Dominican Republic, 1930–38 and 1942–52)
 Rafael "Ramfis" Trujillo (son of Rafael Trujillo)
 Angelita Trujillo (daughter of Rafael Trujillo)
 Ramfis Domínguez-Trujillo (grandson of Rafael Trujillo, son of Angelita Trujillo)
 Héctor Trujillo (brother of Rafael Trujillo; President of the Dominican Republic, 1952–60)

Ecuador
The Arosemena family
Carlos Julio Arosemena Tola (President of Ecuador, 1947–48)
Carlos Julio Arosemena Monroy (son; President of Ecuador, 1961–63)
Otto Arosemena (nephew of Carlos Julio Arosemena Tola; President of Ecuador, 1966–68)

The Bucaram family
Assad Bucaram (Mayor of Guayaquil and President of the National Congress of Ecuador)
Abdalá Bucaram (nephew; President of Ecuador, 1996–97)
Abdalá Bucaram, Jr. (son of Abdalá senior; Member of the National Assembly)
Jaime Roldos Aguilera (nephew by marriage of Assad Bucaram; President of Ecuador, 1979–81)

The Plaza family (father-son)
Leonidas Plaza (President of Ecuador, 1901–1905 and 1912–1916)
Galo Plaza (President of Ecuador, 1948–1952)

Egypt
The Ghali family
Boutros Ghali Pasha (Prime Minister of Egypt, 1908–1910)
Boutros Boutros-Ghali (grandson of Boutros Ghali Pasha)
 Minister for Foreign Affairs
Secretary-General of the United Nations, 1992–1996
Youssef Boutros Ghali (nephew of Boutros Boutros-Ghali)
 Minister for Economic Affairs (1999–2001)
 Minister for Foreign Trade (2001–2004)
 Minister for Finance and Insurance (2004– )

The Mubarak family (father-son)
Hosni Mubarak (President of Egypt, 1981–2011)
Gamal Mubarak (former General Secretary of the Policy Committee of the National Democratic Party)

The Abaza family

El Salvador
The Meléndez-Quiñónez family
Carlos Meléndez (President of El Salvador, 1915–18)
Jorge Meléndez (brother of Carlos Meléndez; President of El Salvador, 1919–23)
Alfonso Quiñónez Molina (brother-in-law of Jorge Meléndez; President of El Salvador, 1923–27)

Equatorial Guinea
The Nguema family (close relatives)

Francisco Macías Nguema (President, 1968–79)
Ela Nguema (Presidential Aide)
Eyegue Ntutumu (governor of Río Muni)
Ángel Masié Ntutumu (minister of interior)
Bonifacio Nguema Esono Nchama (Vice President)
Oyono Ayingono (finance minister)
Maye Ela (head of the navy)
Feliciano Oyono (leader of Macías' PUNT party)
Teodoro Obiang Nguema Mbasogo (President, 1979–)
Teodorín Nguema Obiang (forestry minister)
Constancia Mangue de Obiang (first lady)
Teodoro Nguema Obiang Mangue (infrastructure minister)
Armengol Ondo Nguema (director of security)
Antonio Mba Nguema (police chief)
Agustín Ndong Ona (military inspector-general)
Gabriel Mbaga Obiang Lima (mining minister)
Demetrio Elo Ndong Nsefumu (first deputy prime minister)
Alejandro Evuna Owono Asangono (chief of the presidency)
Marcelino Oyono Ntutumu (transport minister)
Lucas Nguema Evono Mbang (sports minister)
Jaime Obama Owono Nchama (minister-delegate for infrastructure)
Manuel Nguema Mba (minister-delegate for the interior)
Pastor Micha Ondo Bile (foreign affairs minister)[happy]
Rubén Maye Nsue Mangue (ambassador to the US)
Clemente Engonga Nguema Onguéné (interior minister)
Baltasár Engonga Edjo (economy minister)
Cristóbal Menana Ela (energy minister)
Teresa Efua Asangono (women's affairs minister)
Francisco Edu Ngua Okomo (secretary of state for foreign affairs)
Victoriana Nchama Nsue Okomo (secretary of state for foreign affairs)
Francisco Mabale Nseng (secretary of state for energy)
Melchor Esono Edjo (secretary of state for the treasury)

Estonia
The Grünthal family
Timotheus Grünthal
Ivar Grünthal (son of Timotheus Grünthal)

The Helme family
Mart Helme
Martin Helme (son of Mart Helme, nephew of Rein Helme)
Helle-Moonika Helme (wife of Mart Helme)
Rein Helme (brother of Mart Helme)

The Jürgenson family
Kalle Jürgenson
Toivo Jürgenson (brother of Kalle Jürgenson)

The Kallas family
Siim Kallas
Kaja Kallas (daughter of Siim Kallas)

The Lauristin-Allik family
Johannes Lauristin (first husband of Olga Lauristin, father of Marju Lauristin)
Olga Lauristin (wife of Johannes Lauristin and later Hendrik Allik, mother of Marju Lauristin and Jaak Allik)
Marju Lauristin (daughter of Johannes and Olga Lauristin)
Hendrik Allik (second husband of Olga Lauristin, father of Jaak Allik)
Jaak Allik (son of Hendrik Allik and Olga Lauristin, half brother of Marju Lauristin)

The Mathiesen family
Mihkel Mathiesen
Mait Mihkel Mathiesen (son of Mihkel Mathiesen)

The Lenk family
Heimar Lenk
Marika Tuus (sister of Heimar Lenk)

The Lotman family
Mihhail Lotman (son of Juri Lotman, brother of Aleksei Lotman)
Aleksei Lotman (son of Juri Lotman, brother of Mihhail Lotman)

The Must family
Aadu Must
Kadri Simson (daughter of Aadu Must)

The Oviir family
Siiri Oviir
Mihkel Oviir (husband of Siiri Oviir)

The Päts family
Konstantin Päts
Viktor Päts (son of Konstantin Päts)
Matti Päts (grandson of Konstantin Päts)
Leo Päts (son of Konstantin Päts; :et:Leo Päts)
Peeter Päts (brother of Konstantin Päts)
Voldemar Päts (brother of Konstantin Päts)

The Ratas family
Rein Ratas
Jüri Ratas (son of Rein Ratas)

The Reiljan family
Villu Reiljan
Janno Reiljan (brother of Villu Reiljan)

The Sarapuu family
Arvo Sarapuu
Kersti Sarapuu (wife of Arvo Sarapuu)

The Savisaar family
Edgar Savisaar
Vilja Savisaar (former wife of Edgar Savisaar)

The Tarand family
Andres Tarand
Indrek Tarand (son of Andres Tarand)
Kaarel Tarand (son of Andres Tarand)

The Tõnisson family
Jaan Tõnisson
Ilmar Tõnisson (son of Jaan Tõnisson)

The Tsahkna family
Anders Tsahkna (:et:Anders Tsahkna)
Margus Tsahkna

The Uluots family
Jaan Uluots
Jüri Uluots (son of Jaan Uluots)
Ülo Uluots (nephew of Jüri Uluots)

The Veidemann family
Andra Veidemann
Rein Veidemann (husband of Andra Veidemann)

Fiji

Finland
The Heinäluoma family
Eero Heinäluoma (MEP)
Eveliina Heinäluoma (daughter, MP)

The Kalli family
Timo Kalli (MP)
Eeva Kalli (daughter, MP)

The Kuusinen family
Otto Ville Kuusinen (communist leader, fled to the Soviet Union and became a prominent politician there)
Hertta Kuusinen (daughter, MP for the Finnish People's Democratic League 1945–1971)

The Paasio family (father-son-granddaughter)
Rafael Paasio (social democratic party leader)
Pertti Paasio (son, social democratic party leader)
Heli Paasio (daughter of Pertti Paasio, MP)

The Tuomioja–Wuolijoki family
Walto Tuomioja (MP)
Sakari Tuomioja (son Prime Minister)
Erkki Tuomioja (son Foreign Minister)
Juho Wuolijoki (MP)
Wäinö Wuolijoki (son Speaker of Parliament) 
Sulo Wuolijoki (son MP)
Hella Wuolijoki (spouse MP)

The Vennamo family (father-son)
Veikko Vennamo (Cabinet minister)
Pekka Vennamo (Cabinet minister)

The Aura family (father-son-grandson)
Jalo Aura (Cabinet minister)
Teuvo Aura (Cabinet minister)
Matti Aura (Cabinet minister)

The Häkämies family (father-son-son)
Erkki Häkämies (MP)
Jyri Häkämies (Cabinet minister)
Kari Häkämies (Cabinet minister)

France
The Bardoux-Giscard d'Estaing family
Agénor Bardoux, (Minister of State Education)
Jacques Bardoux, (French senator 1938–1940, Deputy 1945–1955), son of Agénor Bardoux
Valéry Giscard d'Estaing, (President of the Republic 1974–1981), grandson of Jacques Bardoux
Louis Giscard d'Estaing, (Member of Parliament 2002–2012), son of Valéry Giscard d'Estaing

The Debré family
 Michel Debré, Prime Minister of France under de Gaulle;
 Jean-Louis Debré, son of Michel, President Speaker of the French National Assembly from 2002 to 2007, President of the Constitutional Council (France) from 2007 to 2016; 
 Bernard Debré, son of Michel and brother of Jean-Louis, former minister, member of the French National Assembly, professor of medicine.

The De Gaulle family
Pierre de Gaulle – Senator 1948–1951, then Member of Parliament 1951–1956; younger brother of Charles
Charles de Gaulle – President of the Republic 1959–1969
Philippe de Gaulle – French senator; son of Charles de Gaulle
Charles de Gaulle, Jr. – Member of the European Parliament for the right-wing National Rally; grandson of Charles de Gaulle

The Hollande family
François Hollande – President of the French Republic, former husband of
Segolène Royal – French politician, former minister, and unsuccessful candidate for the presidency of the French Republic (2007)

The François-Poncet-Missoffe-Panafieu family

 André François-Poncet – French politician, former secretary of state, father of 
 Jean François-Poncet, brother-in-law of Helène Missoffe – French politician, former senator, former ambassador, brother-in-law of 
 Hélène Missoffe, French politician, former minister, former member of French Parliament, wife of
 François Missoffe, French politician, former minister, former ambassador, father of
 Françoise de Panafieu – French politician, former minister, former member of French Parliament

The Le Pen family
Jean-Marie Le Pen – founder of the right-wing National Rally
Marine Le Pen – President of the National Rally
Marion Maréchal-Le Pen – Member of Parliament (2012-2017), granddaughter of Jean-Marie Le Pen and niece of Marine Le Pen.

The Mitterrand family (uncle-nephew)
François Mitterrand – President of the Republic 1981–95
Frédéric Mitterrand – Minister of Culture and Communication 2009–12

The Casimir-Perier family
Casimir Perier, Prime Minister
Auguste Casimir-Perier, Interior Minister, son of Casimir Perier
Jean Casimir-Perier, President, son of Auguste Casimir-Perier

The Poniatowski family

 Michel Poniatowski, Minister of health, Minister of the interior, Member of Parliament, MEP, Senator, Mayor of L'Isle-Adam, father of
 Ladislas Poniatowski, Member of Parliament, Senator, Mayor of Quillebeuf-sur-Seine, General Councillor
 Axel Poniatowski, Member of Parliament, Chairman of the Foreign Affairs Committee, Mayor of L'Isle-Adam, General Councillor, father of
 Sébastien Poniatowski, Mayor of L'Isle-Adam

The Sarkozy family
Nicolas Sarkozy, President of the Republic 2007–12
Jean Sarkozy, French UMP politician, son of Nicolas Sarkozy

The Villepin family (father-son)
Xavier de Villepin – Senator
Dominique de Villepin (Secretary of State for Foreign Affairs, Secretary of State for the Interior, Prime Minister of France), son of Xavier de Villepin

Gabon
The M'ba-Eyeghe Ndong family
Léon M'ba (President)
Jean Eyeghe Ndong (nephew, Prime Minister)

The Sassou-Nguesso family and Bongo family
Emmanuel Yoka (Congolese cabinet chief; uncle of Sassou-Nguesso)
Denis Sassou-Nguesso (President of the Republic of Congo)
Jean-Dominique Okemba (leader of national Security Council; nephew of Sassou-Nguesso)
Edgar Nguesso (nephew of Sassou-Nguesso; director of estate)
Hilaire Moko (director of government security; nephew of Sassou-Nguesso)
Denis Christel Nguesso (nephew of Sassou-Nguesso; senior state oil company official)
Wilfrid Nguesso (brother of Edgar; senior parastatal director)
Gabriel Oba-Apounou (Vice-President of National Assembly of Gabon; cousin of Sassou-Nguesso)
Claudia Lemboumba-Nguesso (Sassou's daughter; wife of M. Leboumba; communications director)
Martin Lemboumba (husband of Lemboumba-Nguesso; son of J. Lemboumba)
Jean-Pierre Lemboumba (Finance Minister; father of M. Leboumba)
Sandrine Nguesso (Sassou's daughter; married to Kabila)
Joseph Kabila (President of the Democratic Republic of the Congo)
Antoinette Sassou Nguesso (First Lady of the Republic of Congo; married to Sassou-Nguesso)
Edith Nguesso-Bongo (Sassou-Nguesso's daughter)
Omar Bongo (President of Gabon and husband of Edith Sassou-Nguesso)
Ali Bongo Ondimba (President of Gabon and son of Omar)
Pascaline Bongo Ondimba (Foreign Minister of Gabon, current Presidential Cabinet Director, and daughter of Omar)
Paul Toungui (Foreign Minister of Gabon, husband of Pascaline)
Martin Bongo (Foreign Minister of Gabon, nephew of Omar)

Germany
The Adenauer family
Konrad Adenauer, Chancellor of Germany
Max Adenauer, Oberstadtdirektor and Councillor in Cologne, son of Konrad
Sven-Georg Adenauer, Landrat (District Director) in the Landkreis (district) of Gütersloh, grandson of Konrad

The Albrecht family (father–daughter)
Ernst Albrecht, (Minister-President of Lower Saxony)
Ursula von der Leyen, (President of the European Commission, 2019–present, Federal Minister of Defence 2013–2019, Federal Minister of Labour and Social Affairs, 2009–2013, Federal Minister of Family Affairs, Senior Citizens, Women and Youth, 2005–2009), daughter of Ernst

The Bismarck family
Otto von Bismarck, Chancellor (Minister-President) of the German Empire, 1871–90
Herbert von Bismarck, (Minister from 1888 to 1890, Member of the Reichstag from 1893), son of Otto
Otto von Bismarck, Jr., (1897–1975, Member of the Reichstag 1924–28, Member of the Bundestag 1953–65), son of Herbert
Carl-Eduard von Bismarck, (Member of the Bundestag 2005-07), grandson of Otto Jr.
Gottfried von Bismarck, (1901–49, Member of the Reichstag 1933–44), son of Herbert

The Bülow family
Bernhard Ernst von Bülow (1815–79), German Minister of the Exterior
Bernhard von Bülow (1849–1929), Minister of the Exterior, Chancellor, son of the former
Bernhard Wilhelm von Bülow, vice Minister of the Exterior, nephew of the former

The Bülows are an old Mecklenburg aristocratic dynasty with many members active in politics, in church or in the military.

The de Maizière family
Ulrich de Maizière, inspector general of the West German Army
Lothar de Maizière, (Minister-President of the German Democratic Republic March–October 1990), nephew of Ulrich
Thomas de Maizière, (Federal Minister of the Interior and Defense from 2009–18), son of Ulrich and cousin of Lothar

The Ebert family (father-son)
Friedrich Ebert, President of Germany
Friedrich Ebert Jr., Mayor of East Berlin

The Goppel family
Alfons Goppel, (Minister-President of the state of Bavaria)
Thomas Goppel, (Minister of Science, Research and the Arts of the state of Bavaria), son of Alfons

The Guttenberg family
Karl Ludwig von Guttenberg, Member of the resistance against Hitler (d. 1945)
Georg Enoch, Freiherr von und zu Guttenberg, (Hereditary Peer in Bavaria), brother of Karl Ludwig
Karl Theodor Freiherr von und zu Guttenberg, (co-founder of a Bavarian party, Member of the German Parliament), son of Georg Enoch
Karl-Theodor zu Guttenberg, Federal Minister of Defence between 2009 and 2011, grandson of Karl Theodor

The Gysi family (father and son)
Klaus Gysi, (GDR Minister of Culture, Ambassador to Italy, State Secretary for Church Affairs) (d 1999)
Gregor Gysi, (Human rights lawyer, chair of the Party of Democratic Socialism (PDS, now Die Linke), leader of PDS fraction in the Bundestag, Economics Senator in Berlin city government), son of Klaus

The Koch family
Karl-Heinz Koch, (Justice Minister in Hesse)
Roland Koch, (former Minister-President of Hesse), son of Karl-Heinz

The Lambsdorff family
Otto Graf Lambsdorff, Minister of Economics (1977–1982, 1982–1984)
Alexander Graf Lambsdorff, MEP (since 2004), nephew of Otto Graf Lambsdorff

The Niklas/Ertl family
Wilhelm Niklas, (Minister for Agriculture) (d. 1957)
Josef Ertl, (Minister for Agriculture) (d. 2000), son-in-law of Wilhelm

The Schäuble family
Karl Schäuble, Member of Parliament, Baden (1947–1952)
Thomas Schäuble, Minister for Transport, Justice and the Interior of Baden-Württemberg, son of Karl
Wolfgang Schäuble, Federal Minister of the Interior and of Finance and incumbent President of the Bundestag, son of Karl
Thomas Strobl, former member of the Bundestag and current Deputy Prime Minister of Baden-Württemberg, son-in-law of Wolfgang

The Speer family (father–daughter)
Albert Speer, (Nazi Minister of Armaments and War Production)
Hildegard Schramm (Vice-President of the Berlin House of Deputies), daughter of Albert

The Strauss family (father–daughter)
Franz Josef Strauss, (Minister-President of the state of Bavaria)
Monika Hohlmeier, (Minister of Education and the Arts of the state of Bavaria), daughter of Franz Josef

The Vogel brothers
Bernhard Vogel, (Minister-President of Rheinland-Pfalz and Minister-President of Thuringia), CDU
Hans-Jochen Vogel, (Mayor of Munich, Mayor of Berlin, Minister of Justice), SPD

The Weizsäcker family (grandfather-father-son-nephew)
Karl Hugo von Weizsäcker (Minister-President of Württemberg)
Ernst von Weizsäcker (Diplomat, Head of the Political Department of the Foreign Office); son of Karl Hugo
Richard von Weizsäcker (President of Germany); son of Ernst
Ernst Ulrich von Weizsäcker (German Member of Parliament); nephew of Richard
Jakob von Weizsäcker (Member of the European Parliament); son of Ernst Ulrich

Ghana
The Agyarko family (brothers and sister)
Boakye Agyarko (Minister) 
Emmanuel Kwabena Kyeremateng Agyarko (M.P.)
Dedo Difie Agyarko-Kusi Parliamentary aspirant, ambassador

The Ahwoi family (brothers)
Kwamena Ahwoi (Minister) 
Kwesi Ahwoi (Minister)
Ato Ahwoi

The Akufo-Addo family (father-son)
Edward Akufo-Addo (President, 1970–1972)
Nana Akufo-Addo (President, 2017–present, Foreign Minister, 2003–2007)

The Atta Mills family (brothers)
John Atta Mills (President, 2009–2012, Vice President, 1997–2000)
Samuel Atta Mills (MP)

The Ayariga family (father, sons)
Frank Abdulai Ayariga (MP 1979–1981) 
Hassan Ayariga (son) (presidential candidate)
Mahama Ayariga (son) (MP, 2005–2009, 2013–present, Minister, Deputy Minister, Presidential Spokesman)

The Bawumia family (father, son, daughter-in-law)
Mumuni Bawumia (former member of Council of State)
Mahamudu Bawumia (son) (Vice President)
Samira Bawumia (daughter-in-law, née Ramadan (wife of Vice President Bawumia. See Ramadan family)

The Jinapor family (brothers)
Samuel Abu Jinapor (Deputy Chief of staff)
John Jinapor (MP, Deputy Minister)

The Kufuor family (brothers, brother-in-law)
John Kufuor (President, 2001–2008)
Kwame Addo-Kufuor (MP, Minister of Defence, presidential candidate)
J. H. Mensah (brother-in-law of John Kufuor MP, Minister)

The Marfo family (brothers)
Yaw Osafo-Marfo (MP Minister) 
Isaac K. Adjei-Marfo (former Secretary for Agriculture and later for Cocoa Affairs)

The Mahama family (father-son)
Emmanuel Adama Mahama (father) (MP and Minister, 1st Republic, Presidential adviser, 3rd Republic) 
John Dramani Mahama son, President, 2012–2017, Vice President, 2009–2012, MP, Minister)

The Nkrumah family (father- daughter-son)
Kwame Nkrumah (father, leader of government business, first Prime Minister, first President MP) 
Samia Nkrumah (daughter, MP, 2008–2012, Chairman of political party)
Sekou Nkrumah (son)

The Obetsebi-Lamptey family (father, son)
Emmanuel Obetsebi-Lamptey
Jacob Otanka Obetsebi-Lamptey (son) (Party Chairman, chief of staff, Minister, Presidential candidate)

The Ocquaye family (father, son)
Aaron Mike Oquaye (Minister, Speaker of parliament, MP) 
Mike Ocquaye Junior (Ambassador, Parliamentary aspirant)

The Ofori Atta family 
J. B. Danquah (former political party chairman)
Aaron Ofori-Atta (former Speaker of Parliament, Minister)
Adeline Akufo-Addo (former First Lady)
Nana Akufo-Addo (President, 2017–present) See Akufo Addo family
William Ofori Atta (former Minister and presidential candidate)
Akwasi Amoako-Atta (former bank governor and Minister)
Jones Ofori Atta (Deputy Minister)
Ken Ofori-Atta (Finance Minister, 2017-Date)

The Okudzeto family (father, nephews)
Sam Okudzeto (MP, Member of Council of State)
Samuel Okudzeto Ablakwa (nephew) (Deputy Minister, MP)
Perry Curtis Kwabla Okudzeto (nephew) (Deputy Minister)

The Ramadan family (father, son, daughter)
Ahmed Ramadan (former political party chairman)
Mohammed Adamu Ramadan (MP aspirant, presidential staffer)
Abu Ramadan (political party youth organiser, deputy head of National Disaster Management Authority)
Samira Bawumia née Ramadan (wife of Vice President Bawumia. See Bawumia family)

The Rawlings family (father-wife-daughter)
Jerry Rawlings (Soldier, Head of State and President, 1979, 1981–2000 founder of political party) 
Nana Konadu Agyeman Rawlings (wife)(Vice Chair of a political party, founder of political party, presidential candidate, leader of women's movement)
Zanetor Agyeman-Rawlings (daughter)(MP, 2016–Present)

The Smith family (brothers)
Joseph Henry Smith (Minister, Ambassador)
Emmanuel Victor Smith (Spokesperson for ex president, Ambassador)

Greece

Guatemala
The Cerezo family
Marco Vinicio Cerezo Sierra (Supreme Court judge)
Vinicio Cerezo (President of Guatemala)
Celso Cerezo (legislative deputy)
The Rios family
Efraín Rios Montt (former de facto Head of State and Congressman)
Zury Ríos Sosa (Legislative deputy and presidential current candidate)

Guyana
The Burnham family
Forbes Burnham (President of Guyana, 1980–85; Prime Minister of Guyana, 1966–80)
Viola Burnham (wife of Forbes Burnham; Vice President, 1985–91)

The Jagan family
Cheddi Jagan (President of Guyana, 1992–97)
Janet Jagan (wife of Cheddi Jagan; President of Guyana, 1997–99)
Cheddi "Joey" Jagan Jr., son of Cheddi and Janet
Derek Chunilall Jagan (brother of Cheddi Jagan; Speaker of the National Assembly of Guyana)

Haiti
The Duvalier family (father-son)
François Duvalier (President of Haiti, 1957–71)
Jean-Claude Duvalier (son of François Duvalier; President of Haiti, 1971–86)

Honduras
The Azcona family (father-sons)
José Azcona del Hoyo President of Honduras (1986–-90)
Jose Simon Azcona Bocock, Tegucigalpa Regidor (2002–-06) and Francisco Morazán Department Deputy (2006–2010)
Elizabeth Azcona Bocock or Lizi Azcona, Secretary of Industry and Commerce of Honduras (2006)
The Flores family (father-daughter)
Carlos Roberto Flores President of Honduras (1998–2002)
Mary Elizabeth Flores Flake or Lizzie Flores daughter of Carlos Roberto Flores, Deputy of the Francisco Morazán Department and First Vice-President of the Congress (2002-2008)

The Melgar family (spouses)
Juan Alberto Melgar Castro, President of Honduras (1975–78)
Nora Gúnera de Melgar (Mayor and Presidential candidate) and deputy candidate in the Primary Elections in 2008

The Reina brothers
Carlos Roberto Reina, President of Honduras (1994–98)
Jorge Arturo Reina Idiáquez, Interior Minister (2006–07)

Hungary
The Antall family (grandfather–father–son)
József Antall (Government Commissioner for Refugees in the Second World War, Minister for Reconstruction after 1945)
József Antall (Prime Minister 1990–93), son of József Antall
Péter Antall (Director of the Democratic Forum [MDF]'s Political Foundation), son of József Antall jr.

The Göncz family (father–daughter)
Árpád Göncz (President)
Kinga Göncz (foreign minister), daughter of Árpád

India

Indonesia

Iran
The Davidkhanian family

 Markar Khan Davidkhanian, Minister of Finance (1804-1848)
 David Khan Davidkhanian, Ambassador and Chief Physician to the Shah of Iran (1795-1851)
 Martiros Khan Davidkhanian, General and Chief of Staff of the Cossack Brigade (1843-1905)
 Eskandar Khan Davidkhanian, General and Deputy Commander of the Cossack Brigade
 Sarkis Khan Davidkhanian, General and Founder of the modern Iranian Postal System (1846-)
 Soleiman Khan Davidkhanian, General (1852-1895)
 Meguertitch Khan Davidkhanian, Governor of Dezful and Khorramshahr (1902-1983)

The Khamenei family (grand children (1st cousins) and great grand children (2nd cousins) are married to each other)
Ayatollah Ali Khamenei, Supreme Leader of Iran
Gholam Ali Haddad-Adel, Speaker of the Parliament

The Mosaddegh family (father-in-law, son-in-law)
Mohammad Mosaddegh, Prime Minister (1951–53)
Ahmad Matin-Daftari, Prime Minister (1939–40)

The Mansur family (father-son)
Ali Mansur, Prime Minister (1940–41, 1950)
Hassan Ali Mansur, Prime Minister (1964–65)

The Zahedi family (father-son)
Fazlollah Zahedi, Prime Minister (1953–1955)
Ardeshir Zahedi, Foreign Minister (1966–1973)

The Larijani family (father-son, groom)
Mirza Hashem Amoli
Mohammad-Javad Larijani
Ali Larijani
Sadeq Larijani
Bagher Larijani
Fazel Larijani
Mostafa Mohaghegh Damad (family groom)

Iraq
The Allawi-Chalabi family
Abdul Majid Allawi OBE (Minister of Transport, Lord at the House of Lords before 1958)
Abdul Amir Allawi (Minister of Health, before 1958)
Jaffar Allawi (Minister of Housing)
Iyad Allawi (Prime Minister)
Mohammad Allawi (Minister of Telecommunications)
Ali Allawi (Defense Minister and Minister of Trade), cousin of Iyad Allawi
Nouri al-Badran (interior minister), brother-in-law of Iyad Allawi
Ahmed Chalabi (former Iraqi Governing Council President), uncle of Ali Allawi
Salem Chalabi (head of judicial panel to try Saddam Hussein), nephew of Ahmed Chalabi

The Arif family
Abdul Salam Arif (President)
Abdul Rahman Arif (President), brother of Abdul Salam Arif

The Barzani family
Mustafa Barzani (leader of the Kurdistan Democratic Party)
Massoud Barzani (President of Iraqi Kurdistan), son of Mustafa Barzani
Nechervan Idris Barzani (Prime Minister of Iraqi Kurdistan), nephew of Mustafa Barzani
 Masrour Barzani Head of the Kurdistan Region Security Council 
The Hussein family
Saddam Hussein (former President)
Raghad Hussien (Iraqi politician) daughter of Saddam Hussein 
Uday Hussein, son of Saddam Hussein
Qusay Hussein (Leader of the Iraqi Republican Guard) son of Saddam Hussein
Barzan Ibrahim al-Tikriti (Head of the Iraqi Intelligence service) Half brother of Saddam Hussein 
Sabawi Ibrahim al-Tikriti (Head of the Directorate of General Secretary) Half brother of Saddam Hussein 
Watban Ibrahim al-Tikriti (Minister of interior) Half brother of Saddam Hussein 
Ahmed Hassan al-Bakr (former President) Father in law of Saddam Hussein's cousin

Al-Suwaidi Family
Yusuf Al-Suwaidi (First Iraqi Speaker of the Senate and Revolutionary)
Naji Al-Suwaidi (Iraqi Prime minister, son of Yusuf)
Tawfeeq Al-Suwaidi (three term Iraqi Prime minister, son of Yusuf)
Arif Al-Suwaidi (Iraqi Politician and Judge, son of Yusuf)

Al-Pachachi Family
Muzahim al-Pachachi (Iraqi prime minister)
Adnan Al-Pachachi (Iraqi foreign minister and Emirati Minister of state and advisor) son of Muzahim
Hamdi Al-Pachachi (Iraqi prime minister) brother of Muzahim
Nadim al-Pachachi (Minister of Economy and Secretary general of OPEC) nephew of Muzahim and Hamdi

Ireland

The Ahern family
Bertie Ahern (Fianna Fáil Leader 1994–2008, Taoiseach 1997–2008, TD Dublin Central 1977–2011)
his brother Maurice Ahern (born 1938): Fianna Fáil Councillor and former Lord Mayor of Dublin 1999–2009
his brother Noel Ahern (born 1944): Fianna Fáil Minister of State (Housing & Drug Strategy) TD Dublin North West 1992–2011

The Blaney family
Neal Blaney (Fianna Fáil TD 1927–38 and 1943–48, Fianna Fáil Senator 1938–43)
Neil Blaney (son of Neal Blaney; Fianna Fáil/IFF TD 1948–1995, IFF MEP Connacht–Ulster 1979–84, 1989–94)
Harry Blaney (son of Neal Blaney; IFF TD 1997–2002)
Niall Blaney (son of Harry Blaney; IFF/Fianna Fáil TD 2002–11)

The Cosgrave family
W. T. Cosgrave (member of the first Dáil Éireann, President of the Executive Council 1922–32, Cumann na nGaedheal leader 1922–34, Fine Gael leader 1934–44)
Liam Cosgrave (son of W. T. Cosgrave; Fine Gael TD 1944–81, Fine Gael leader 1965–77, Taoiseach 1973–77)
Liam T. Cosgrave (son of Liam Cosgrave, grandson of W. T. Cosgrave; Fine Gael TD 1981–87, Senator 1993–2002)

The De Valera family
Éamon de Valera (President of Dáil Éireann 1919–22, President of the Executive Council 1927–32, Taoiseach 1932–48, 1951–54, 1957–59 and President of Ireland 1959–73)
Vivion de Valera (son of Éamon de Valera; Fianna Fáil TD 1945–81)
Síle de Valera (granddaughter of Éamon de Valera; Clare Fianna Fáil TD 1977–2007, Minister for Arts, Heritage, Gaeltacht and the Islands 1997–2002)
Éamon Ó Cuív (grandson of Éamon de Valera; former member of Seanad Éireann, Galway West Fianna Fáil TD 1992–present, Minister for Community, Rural and Gaeltacht Affairs 2002–11)

The Kitt-Brady family
Michael F. Kitt (Fianna Fáil TD at intervals, 1948–75)
Michael P. Kitt (son of Michael F. Kitt; TD and Senator, 1975–2016)
Tom Kitt (son of Michael F. Kitt; TD 1989–2011)
Áine Brady (daughter of Michael F. Kitt; TD 2007–11)
Gerry Brady (Áine Brady's husband; former TD)

The Lemass/Haughey family
Seán Lemass (Fianna Fáil TD 1924–69; Fianna Fáil Leader and Taoiseach 1959–66)
Noel Lemass (son of Seán Lemass; Fianna Fáil TD 1956–76)
Eileen Lemass (daughter-in-law of Seán Lemass; Fianna Fáil TD 1977–81)
Charles Haughey (son-in-law of Seán Lemass; Fianna Fáil TD 1957–92; Fianna Fáil Leader 1979–92 and Taoiseach 1979–81, 1982, 1987–92)
Seán Haughey (son of Charles Haughey; Fianna Fáil TD 1992–2011)

The Lenihan family
Patrick Lenihan (Fianna Fáil TD 1965–70)
Brian Lenihan Snr (son of Patrick Lenihan; Fianna Fáil TD 1961–96)
Mary O'Rourke (née Lenihan) (daughter of Patrick Lenihan; Fianna Fáil TD 1982–02, 2007–11)
Brian Lenihan Jnr (son of Brian Lenihan; Fianna Fáil TD 1996–2011)
Conor Lenihan (son of Brian Lenihan; Fianna Fáil TD 2002–11)

The O'Malley family
Donogh O'Malley (Fianna Fáil TD 1954–68)
Desmond O'Malley (nephew of Donogh O'Malley; TD 1968–2002, Fianna Fáil Cabinet Minister and first leader of the Progressive Democrats)
Fiona O'Malley (daughter of Desmond O'Malley; Progressive Democrats TD 2002–07, Senator 2007–11)
Tim O'Malley (cousin of Desmond O'Malley; Progressive Democrats TD 2002–07)

The Andrews family
David Andrews (Fianna Fáil TD 1965–2000)
Niall Andrews (brother of David Andrews; Fianna Fáil TD 1977–87)
Barry Andrews (son of David Andrews; Fianna Fáil TD 2002–11)
Chris Andrews (son of Niall Andrews; Fianna Fáil TD 2002–11)

The Bruton family
John Bruton (Fine Gael Taoiseach 1994–1997, TD 1969–2004)
Richard Bruton (brother of John Bruton; Fine Gael TD 1982–present, Minister for Communications, Climate Action and Environment 2018–2020, Minister for Education and Skills 2016–2018, Minister for Jobs, Enterprise and Innovation 2011–2016, Deputy Leader of Fine Gael 2002–2010)

The Coveney family
Hugh Coveney (Fine Gael TD 1981–1982, 1982–1987, 1994–1998, Minister for Defense and Minister for the Marine 1994–1995)
Simon Coveney (son of Hugh Coveney; Fine Gael TD 1998–present, Deputy Leader of Fine Gael 2017–present, Minister for Defense 2014–2016, Minister for Housing, Planning, Community and Local Government 2016–2017, Minister for Foreign Affairs 2017–present)

Israel
The Begin family
Menachem Begin, Prime Minister of Israel, 1977–83
Benny Begin, nationalist politician, son of Menachem Begin

The Burg family
Yosef Burg, party leader, National Religious Party; cabinet minister
Avraham Burg, Speaker of the Knesset, 1999–2003, son of Josef Burg

The Dayan family
Shmuel Dayan, Zionist activist and member of the Knesset 1949–59.
Moshe Dayan, IDF Chief of the General Staff; cabinet minister, son of Shmuel Dayan
Yael Dayan, Member of the Knesset 1992–2003, daughter of Moshe Dayan.

The Herzog family
Yitzhak HaLevi Herzog, Ashkenazi chief rabbi
Chaim Herzog, President of Israel, 1983–93, son of Yitzhak Herzog
Isaac Herzog, Member of the Knesset 2003-2018, President of Israel, 2021- , son of Chaim Herzog

The Lau family

 Yisrael Meir Lau, Chief Rabbi, 1993-2003
 David Lau, Chief Rabbi, 2013–present, son of Yisrael Meir

The Rabin family

Yitzhak Rabin, Prime Minister of Israel, 1974–77 and 1992–95
Dalia Rabin-Pelossof, Member of the Knesset 1999–2003, daughter of Yitzhak Rabin

The Sharon family
Ariel Sharon, Prime Minister of Israel, 2001–06
Omri Sharon, Member of the Knesset, 2003–06, son of Ariel Sharon
The Weizman family
Haim Weizman, President of Israel, 1949–52
Ezer Weizman, President of Israel, 1993–2000, nephew of Haim Weizman

The Yosef family
Ovadia Yosef, Chief Rabbi, 1973–83
Yitzhak Yosef, Chief Rabbi, 2013–present, son of Ovadia
Shlomo Amar, Chief Rabbi, 2003–13, chief rabbi of Jerusalem, 2014–present, daughter married the son of Yitzchak Yosef
Yehuda Deri, Chief rabbi of Be'er Sheva, 1997–present, son is married to the daughter of Yitzhak Yosef

Italy
The Berlinguer family
Mario Berlinguer (father of Enrico Berlinguer, Sr.; Member of the Italian Camera dei deputati)
Enrico Berlinguer (son of Mario Berlinguer; leader, Italian Communist Party)
Giovanni Berlinguer (son of Mario Berlinguer; Member of the European Parliament)
Luigi Berlinguer (cousin of Enrico and Giovanni Berlinguer; Italian Minister of University and Education)
Francesco Cossiga (cousin of Enrico and Giovanni Berlinguer; President of the Italian Republic, 1985–92; Prime Minister of Italy, 1979–80)
Antonio Segni (distant relative; President of the Italian Republic, 1962–64; Prime Minister of Italy, 1955–57 and 1959–60)
Mariotto Segni (son of Antonio Segni; Member of the Italian Camera dei deputati)

The Craxi family
Bettino Craxi (Prime Minister of Italy, 1983–87)
Bobo Craxi (son of Bettino Craxi; former leader of the New Italian Socialist Party, then leader of The Italian Socialists now merged in the Socialist Party)
Stefania Craxi (daughter of Bettino Craxi; Member of the Italian Camera dei deputati for the People of Freedom)

The Mussolini family
Benito Mussolini (Prime Minister of Italy, 1922–43)
Alessandra Mussolini (granddaughter of Benito Mussolini; former Member of the European Parliament, Member of the Italian Camera dei deputati)
Galeazzo Ciano (son-in-law of Benito Mussolini; Minister of Foreign Affairs, 1936-1943)

Jamaica
The Charles family

 Pearnel Charles
 Pearnel Patroe Charles Jr. 
 Patrece Charles-Freeman 
 Michelle Charles

The Holness family
 Andrew Holness (Prime Minister of Jamaica, 2011–12, 2016 to present)
 Juliet Holness (wife of Andrew Holness, MP)

The Manley family
Norman Manley (Prime Minister of Jamaica, 1959–62)
Edna Manley (wife of Norman Manley; political activist and writer)
Douglas Manley (son of Norman and Edna Manley; Member of Parliament)
Michael Manley (son of Norman and Edna Manley; Prime Minister of Jamaica, 1972–80 and 1989–92)
Sir Alexander Bustamante (cousin of Norman Manley; Prime Minister of Jamaica, 1962–67)
Hugh Shearer (cousin of Michael Manley; Prime Minister of Jamaica, 1967–72)
The Smith family
 Ernie Smith (MP, 2002–2011)
 Marsha Smith (daughter of Ernie; MP, 2020 to present)
The Vaz family
 Daryl Vaz
 Ann-Marie Vaz

Japan
The Fukuda family 

Takeo Fukuda, Prime Minister (1976–78)
Yasuo Fukuda, Prime Minister (2007–08)

The Hatoyama family 

Hatoyama Kazuo (Speaker of the House of Representatives: 1896–97)
Ichiro Hatoyama (Prime Minister: 1954–56)
 Iichiro Hatoyama, Minister of Foreign Affairs (1976–77)
Yukio Hatoyama, Prime Minister (2009–10)
Kunio Hatoyama, Minister of Education (1991–92), Minister of Justice (2007–08)

The Okawa-Miyazawa family 

Okawa Heikichi (Minister of Justice: 1925; Minister of Railways: 1927–29)
 Okawa, m. Miyazawa Hiroshi (Member of the House of Representatives: 1928–52)
Miyazawa Kiichi (Prime Minister: 1991–93; Deputy Prime Minister: 1987–88; Minister of Finance: 1986–88, 1998–2001; Minister of Foreign Affairs: 1974–76; Minister of Trade and Industry: 1970–73)
 Hiroshi Miyazawa (Governor of Hiroshima: 1973–1981; Minister of Justice: 1995–96)
 Yoichi Miyazawa (Minister of Economy, Trade and Industry: 2014–15)

The Ōkubo-Yoshida-Suzuki-Asō family

Ōkubo Toshimichi. One of the Three Great Founders of Meiji Japan. Minister of Finance 1871–73, Home Minister 1874–78
Makino Nobuaki (born Ōkubo Nobuaki), Minister of Foreign Affairs 1913–14, Lord Keeper of the Privy Seal of Japan 1925–1935), m. Mishima Mineko, daughter of Mishima Michitsune (Governor of Yamaguchi (1879–1882), Fukushima (1882–1884) and Tochigi (1883–1885) prefectures)
 Yukiko, m. Shigeru Yoshida (Minister of Foreign Affairs 1945–47, 1948–52; Prime Minister: 1946–47. 1948–54)
 Kazuko, m. Takakichi Asō
 Tarō Asō (Minister of Foreign Affairs 2005–07; Prime Minister 2008–09; Deputy Prime Minister and Minister of Finance 2012– ), m. Suzuki Chikako, daughter of Zenkō Suzuki (Minister of Agriculture and Forestry 1976–77; Prime Minister: 1980–82)
 Yoshiko, m. Ijuin Hikokichi (Minister of Foreign Affairs 1923–24)

The Satō–Kishi–Abe family 

Satō Hidesuke
Nobusuke Kishi (born Nobusuke Satō), (Prime Minister: 1957–60, Minister of Foreign Affairs: 1956–1957)
 Yoko, m. Shintaro Abe (Minister of Foreign Affairs 1982–86), son of Kan Abe (Member of the House of Representatives 1937–1946)
 Shinzō Abe, Prime Minister (2006–07, 2012–2020)
 Nobuo Kishi, (Member of the House of Councillors 2004–2012; Member of the House of Representatives 2012-; Minister of Defense 2020-)
Sato Eisaku, Prime Minister (1964–72)

The Koizumi family 

Matajiro Koizumi, (Minister of Posts and Telecommunications 1929–1931)
Yoshie, m. Junya Koizumi (born Samejima), Director General of the Japan Defense Agency
Junichiro Koizumi, Prime Minister (2001–06)
Shinjirō Koizumi (Minister of Environment (2019); Member of the House of Representatives)

The Konoe-Hosokawa family 

Konoe Atsumaro (President of the House of Peers: 1896–1903)
Fumimaro Konoe (President of the House of Peers 1933–37, Minister of Foreign Affairs 1938, Prime Minister: 1937–39, 1940–41)
 Yoshiko, m. Morisada Hosokawa
 Morihiro Hosokawa, Prime Minister of Japan (1993–94)

The Nakasone family (father-son)
Yasuhiro Nakasone, Prime Minister (1982–87)
Hirofumi Nakasone, Minister of Foreign Affairs (2008–09)

The Saigō-Ōyama family

Saigō Takamitsu
Ōyama Tsunamasa (born Saigō), m. Ōyama Keiko
 Ōyama Iwao (Genrō: 1912–1916; Superintendent-General of the National Police: 1879–80; Army Minister: 1885–91, 1892–96; Lord Keeper of the Privy Seal: 1915–16)
 Ōyama Kashiwa (Member of the House of Peers: 1916–47)
 Saigō Kichibe
Saigō Takamori (One of the Three Great Founders of Meiji Japan; Minister-Councillor: 1870–1873; acting Head of Government: 1871–1873)
 Saigō Toratarō (Member of the House of Peers: 1902–1919)
 Saigō Kichinosuke (Minister of Justice: 1968–70; Member of the House of Councillors: 1947–73; Member of the House of Peers: 1936–1947)
 Saigō Jūdō (Tsugumichi) (Genrō: 1892–1902; Home Minister: 1890–91, 1898–1900; Navy Minister: 1885–90, 1893–98; Minister of Agriculture and Commerce: 1881–84; War Minister: 1878–80; Minister of Education: 1878) 
 Saigō Jūtoku (Member of the House of Peers: 1902–1946)

The Tanaka family 
Kakuei Tanaka, Prime Minister of Japan (1972–74)
Makiko Tanaka, Minister of Foreign Affairs (2001–02): Minister of Education, Culture, Sports, Science and Technology (2012)

The Obuchi family
Keizō Obuchi, Prime Minister of Japan (1998–2000)
Yūko Obuchi, Minister of Economy, Trade and Industry (2014)

Jordan
The Al-Fayez family 
H.G Mithqal Al-Fayez
H.E Trad Al-Fayez (Minister of Agriculture, Ambassador, Senator)
H.E Akef Al-Fayez (Served as Minister in 10 different governments, Speaker of the Jordanian Parliament, Senator)
H.E Faisal Al-Fayez (Prime Minister of Jordan, Speaker of the House of Representatives, President of the Senate)
H.E Amer Al-Fayez (Chief of Royal Protocol, Ministerial rank)
H.E Eid Al-Fayez (Served as minister in 5 different governments)
H.E Nayef Al-Fayez (Minister of Tourism, Environment)
H.E Nayef Hayel Al-Fayez (Minister of Health, MP)

The Majali family
Premier Hazza' al-Majali (1917–1960), Prime Minister of Jordan
H.E Ayman Hazza' Al-Majali (21st Century), Deputy Prime Minister of Jordan
H.E Hussein Hazza' Al-Majali (2010–present), Minister of Internal affairs Ex-Commandant of Jordanian Public Security Forces
Field Marshal Habis Al-Majali (1914–2001), Jordanian Chief of Staff
Premier Abdelsalam al-Majali (1925–2023), Prime Minister of Jordan
Abdul Hadi Al-Majali (1997–2009), Speaker of the Jordanian Parliament.(1996), Minister of Public Works and Housing.
Sahel Al-Majali (2007–2009), Minister of Public Works and Housing.(2009), Minister of Transport.
The Al-Rifai family
Samir al-Rifai (Prime Minister, 1944–45, 1947, 1950–51, 1956, 1958–59, 1963)
Zaid al-Rifai (son; Prime Minister, 1973–76, 1985–89)
Samir Rifai (son of Zaid al-Rifai; Prime Minister, 2009–11)

The Badran brothers
Mudar Badran (Prime Minister of Jordan, 1976–79, 1980–84, and 1989–91)
Adnan Badran (Prime Minister of Jordan, 2005–06)

The Lawzi family (father-son)
 Ahmed Al-Lawzi Prime Minister
 Nasir Al-Lawzi (Minister of Transportation, Minister of Information)

Kazakhstan
The Jandosov family (founder-son-nephew)
Uraz Kikimovitch Jandosov
Sanjar Urazovitch Jandosov
Ali Urazovitch Jandosov
Oraz Jandosov

The Nazarbayev family (father-daughter)
Nursultan Nazarbayev (President of Kazakhstan from 1990–2019)
Dariga Nazarbayeva (Kazakhstan's ambassador to Russia, business oligarch, wife of Deputy Foreign Minister Rakhat Aliyev and possible successor to her father)

Kosovo

The Sejdiu family
Fatmir Sejdiu (President, 2006–2010)
Pleurat Sejdiu (Minister of Health, Secretary of Health)
Shefki Sejdiu (Member of Parliament)
Korab Sejdiu (Member of Parliament)

The Rugova family
Ibrahim Rugova (President, 2000–2006)
Uke Rugova (Member of Parliament)
Naser Rugova (Member of Parliament)
Teuta Rugova (Member of Parliament)

The Haradinaj family
Ramush Haradinaj (Prime-minister, 2006) (Member of Parliament)
Daut Haradinaj (Member of Parliament)

Kenya
The Kenyatta family
Jomo Kenyatta (President, 1964–78)
Margaret Kenyatta (daughter of Jomo Kenyatta; Mayor of Nairobi)
Uhuru Kenyatta (son of Jomo Kenyatta; Finance Minister, President (2013–present)

The Moi family
Daniel arap Moi (President, 1978–2002)
Gideon Moi (son of Daniel arap Moi; Member of Parliament)

The Odinga family
Oginga Odinga (Vice President of Kenya)
Raila Odinga (son of Oginga Odinga; Prime Minister)
Oburu Odinga (son of Oginga Odinga, Member of Parliament)
Gor Sunguh (Odinga's relative through marriage to Raila Odinga's niece)

The Nyagah family
Jeremiah Nyagah (long-time serving cabinet minister 1963o93 and Member of Parliament 1958–92)
Norman Nyagah (son of Jeremiah Nyagah Government Chief Whip and Member of Parliament)
Jeremiah Jerry Mwaniki Nyagah son of Norman Nyagah, and President of the Kenya Youth Coalition Network International KYCNI, based in Atlanta Georgia USA.
Joseph Nyagah (son of Jeremiah Nyagah and also Member of Parliament)
Nahashon Nyagah (son of Jeremiah Nyagah and former Governor of the Central Bank of Kenya)
Mary Khimulu (daughter of Jeremiah Nyagah and ambassador UNEP to France)

The Awori family (Kenya and Uganda)
 Moody Awori former vice president.
 Aggrey Awori, formerly Member of Parliament and Minister in Uganda.

Kiribati
The Tong family
Anote Tong (President of Kiribati, 2003–2016)
Harry Tong (brother of Anote Tong; leader, National Progressive Party)

Korea, North
The Kim family (1948–present)
Kim Il-sung (Leader of North Korea, 1948–1994), founder of North Korea
Kim Jong-il (Leader of North Korea, 1994–2011), son of Kim Il-sung
Kim Jong-un (Leader of North Korea, 2011–present), grandson of Kim Il-sung
Other members of Kim family
Kim Jong-nam (first son of Kim Jong-il)
Kim Jong-chul (second son of Kim Jong-il)
Other non-bloodline members of Kim family
Ko Yong-hui (first lady of Kim Jong-il)
Ri Sol-ju (first lady of Kim Jong-un)
Jang Song-thaek (brother-in-law of Kim Jong-il; "number-two-man in North Korea" )

Korea, South
The Park family (father-daughter)
Park Chung-hee (President of the Republic of Korea, 1963–1979)
Park Geun-hye (President of the Republic of Korea, 2013–2017), daughter of Park Chung-hee

Kyrgyzstan

The Akayev family (father-daughter)
Askar Akayev (President) 1990–2005
Mariam Akayeva (politician)

The Bakiyev brothers
Kurmanbek Bakiyev (President of Kyrgyzstan)
Janysh Bakiyev (former First Deputy Chairman of the National Security Service)
Marat Bakiyev (Kyrgyzstan's Ambassador to Germany)
Adil Bakiyev (Kyrgyz government official within the Kyrgyz embassy in China)
Akhmat Bakiyev (Kyrgyz politician and business oligarch)
Kanybek Bakiev (Head of a village council)
Jusupbek Bakiev (former Deputy Director of Kyrgyzstan's Agency for Community Development and Investment)

Latvia
The Ulmanis family
Kārlis Ulmanis (President of Latvia, 1936–40)
Guntis Ulmanis (great-nephew of Kārlis Ulmanis; President of Latvia, 1993–99)

Lebanon

El Assaad family
Nasif Al Nassar - ruler of Jabal Amel from the Al-Saghir Dynasty.
Ali Al Saghir - a powerful leader of Jabal Amel.
Khalil Bek El Assaad - appointed Ottoman Governor of Nablus, Al Balqa, Marjayoun, Tyre and Homs.
Shbib Pasha El Assaad - minister of the Ottoman Empire, army leader.
Ali Nasrat El Assaad - advisor of the Court and a Superior in the Ministry of Foreign affairs in the Ottoman Empire.
Kamil Bey (Esad) El-Assaad - representative of the Ottoman Empire in Beyrut.
Ahmed El Assaad - 3rd Legislative Speaker of Lebanon.
Kamel Bek El Assaad- 5th Legislative Speaker of Lebanon, Minister of Education, Minister of Water and Electricity, founder of Democratic Socialist Party (Lebanon).
 Ahmad Kamel El Assaad - Lebanese Option Party founder, political candidate. 
 Moustafa Nassar Bek El Assaad - Supreme Court President.
 Nael El Assaad - envoy for HM King Abdullah of Jordan and former husband of late Saudi magnate Adnan Khashoggi’s sister Soheir.
 Said El Assaad - former Lebanese Ambassador of Switzerland, France and Belgium and a former Member of Parliament.
Bahija Al Solh El Assaad - wife of Said El Assaad, daughter of Prime Minister Riad Al Solh, aunt of Waleed Bin Talal.
 Nasrat El Assaad - ambassador of Lebanon to numerous countries. 
 Haidar El Assaad - historian and among the first official delegates to visit the new People’s Republic of China in the 1960s following Ministerial civil service – later serving as a director at the FAO of the United Nations and consultant to TRW and the World Bank.

Abou Fadel family
Mounir Abou Fadel – Deputy Speaker of the Parliament
Marwan Abou Fadel – Co-founder of the Lebanese Democratic Party, son of Mounir

Al Khalil family
Kazem Al Khalil – Lebanese Parliamentarian, seven time minister, leading Shia feudal zu'ama dynasty of Tyr, Southern Lebanon
Khalil Al Khalil - son of Kazem Al Khalil, served as Ambassador to the Imperial State of Iran from 1971 to 1978, personal friend to the Shah of Iran and ambassador to the Pahlavi Court. 
Maha Al Khalil Chalabi daughter of Kazem Al Khalil, a UNESCO goodwill ambassador involved in the preservation of archeological sites in Tyr through the 'Fondation de Tyr'. Married to Talal Chalabi, brother of Ahmed Chalabi- the founder of the Iraqi National Congress (INC) and the 37th Prime Minister of Iraq. 

Arslan family
Emir Majid Arslan II – Lebanese independence hero and Druze leader.
Emir Faysal Arslan – son of Emir Majid and Head of the House of Arslan from 1983 until 1989 (In conjunction with Emirah Khawla Majid Arslan).
Emir Talal Arslan – son of Emir Majid, Druze leader and current Head of the House of Arslan.
Emir Shakib Arslan – Influential Arab politician, writer, poet and historian.

Chamoun family (father-sons-granddaughter)
Camille Chamoun – President, 1952–58
Dany Chamoun – Militia leader and political party leader; son of Camille
Tracy Chamoun – Author and human rights activist; daughter of Dany
Dory Chamoun – Political party leader; son of Camille

Eddé family
Émile Eddé – President during the French Mandate
Raymond Eddé – political party leader; son of Émile
Carlos Eddé – opposition politician; nephew of Raymond
Michel Eddé – Minister

Karam family
Youssef Bey Karam – Lebanese Maronite notable who fought in the 1860 civil war and led a rebellion in 1866–1867 against the Ottoman Empire rule in Mount Lebanon
Youssef Salim Karam – former MP from Zgharta
Salim Bey Karam – Current MP and former minister, son of Youssef Salim Karam

El Khazen family
Wadih Nemr El Khazen – Lebanese Minister
Wadih Nemr El Khazen – President of the Central Maronite Council
Farid Elias El Khazen – Lebanese Member of Parliament
Farid Haikal El Khazen – Lebanese Minister
Joseph Dergham El Khazen – Maronite Patriarch
Joseph Ragi El Khazen – Maronite Patriarch
Tobias El Khazen – Maronite Patriarch
Mikati family

 Taha Mikati – Businessman; brother of Najib
 Azmi Mikati – Businessman; son of Taha
 Najib Mikati – Prime minister of Lebanon; brother of Taha

Gemmayel family (father-sons-grandsons)
Pierre Gemayel – Kataeb Party founder
Bachir Gemayel – President-elect, 1982; son of Pierre (assassinated before taking office)
Nadim Gemayel – Political activist; son of Bachir
Amine Gemayel – President, 1982–88; son of Pierre
Pierre Amine Gemayel – legislator; son of Amine
Sami Gemayel – Political activist; legislator; son of Amine

Hariri family
Rafic Hariri – 30th Prime Minister
Saad Hariri – 33rd Prime Minister; son of Rafic Hariri
Bahaa Hariri – Political Activist; Parliament Candidate
Bahia Hariri – legislator; sister of Rafic
Ahmad Hariri – Parliamentary candidate; son of Bahia

Al Solh family (Married into the House of Saud)
 Sami al Solh – 3rd Prime Minister
 Adel Al Solh – Politician; Cousin of Sami al Solh
 Riad Al Solh – 1st Prime Minister; Grandfather of Al Waleed bin Talal Al Saud
 Leila Al Solh – Minister of Industry; Daughter of Riad al Solh
 Bahija Al Solh El Assaad - wife of Said El Assaad, daughter of Riad Al Solh, aunt of Waleed Bin Talal.

 Takieddine Solh – 15th Prime Minister; Brother of Kazem Solh
 Kazem Al Solh – Diplomat; Member of Parliament
 Kamel Ahmad Basha el Solh – High judge in the Ottoman Imperial Court
 Afif al Solh – Parliament member of Syria
 Rachid Al Solh – 16th Prime Minister of Lebanon
 Waheed Al Solh – Activist; Politician; First cousin and husband of Mounira Al solh
 Mounira Al Solh – Political Activist; Parliament Candidate; First cousin and wife of Waheed Al solh
 Sana Al Solh – Political Activist 

Helou family
Charles Helou – President (1964–70)
Nina Helou – First Lady
Pierre Helou – Cabinet Minister;
Henry Helou – legislator; son of Pierre

Jumblatt family (father-son)
Kamal Jumblatt – founder, Progressive Socialist Party, Cabinet Minister
Walid Jumblatt – Civil War militia leader; Cabinet Minister; son of Kamal
Taymour Jumblatt – Member of Parliament; son of Walid

Karami family (father-sons)
Abdul Hamid Karami (Prime Minister of Lebanon)
Rashid Karami – Prime Minister older son of Abdul Hamid
Omar Karami – Prime Minister younger son of Abdul Hamid.
Faisal Karami – Member of Parliament; son of Omar
Hobeika Family (husband-wife and child)

 Elie Hobeika – Member of Parliament and malitia leader
 Gina Hobeika – Former Party leader; Wife of Elie Hobeika
 Joseph Hobeika – Party leader

Lahoud family
Salim Lahoud – Member of Parliament (1952, 1956, 1960, 1968), Minister (Defense, Foreign affairs).
Nassib Lahoud – Member of Parliament (1991, 1992, 1996, 2000), Cabinet Minister (State, 2008), President of the Democratic Renewal Movement (son of Salim).
Fouad Lahoud – Member of Parliament (1972) (cousin of Jamil, brother of Salim).
Jamil Lahoud – Member of Parliament (1964) and Chief of the Army (cousin of Salim, Fouad).
Émile Lahoud – President of Lebanon and Chief of the Army (son of Jamil).
Emile Emile Lahoud- Minister (Youth and Sports) and Member of Parliament 2000 (elder son of Emile Jamil).
Nasri Lahoud – Head of the High Legal Magistrate, Military Judge (son of Jamil).

Moawad family (husband-wife)
René Moawad – President (1989)
Nayla Moawad – legislator; widow of René
Michel Moawad – Parliament member

Frangieh family
Suleiman Frangieh – President (1970–76)
Tony Frangieh – Cabinet Minister, Civil War militia leader; son of Suleiman
Suleiman Frangieh, Jr. – legislator and Minister; son of Tony

Salam family
 Salim Ali Salam – held many local offices in Beirut
 Anbara Salam Khalidi – feminist activist; daughter of Salim
 Saeb Salam – 8th Prime Minister of Lebanon; son of Salim
 Tammam Salam – 49th Prime Minister of Lebanon and acting president of Lebanon; son of Seab

Skaff family
 Joseph Skaff – held several ministerial positions
 Elias Skaff – Parliament member; married to Myriam Skaff

Liberia
The Barclay-Tubman family
Arthur Barclay (President, 1904–12)
Edwin Barclay (nephew, President, 1930–44)
William Tubman (son-in-law, President, 1944–71)
Winston Tubman (nephew, Justice Minister)

Skivring Smith family (father-son)
James Skivring Smith (President, 1871–72)
James Skivring Smith, Jr. (Vice President, 1930–44)

The Taylor family
Charles Taylor (President, 1997–2003)
Jewel Taylor (Ex-wife, Senator 2006–present, Vice President 2018–present)

Lithuania 

Landsbergis / Jablonskis
Maldeikis
Paleckis
Karbauskis

Madagascar
The Ratsiraka family (uncle-nephew)
Didier Ratsiraka (President of Madagascar)
Roland Ratsiraka (Mayor of Toamasina)

The Sylla family (father-son)
Albert Sylla (Foreign Minister)
Jacques Sylla (Prime Minister)

The Tsiranana family (father-son)
Philibert Tsiranana (President of Madagascar)
Pierre Tsiranana (Governor of Mahajanga)

Malawi
The Chirwa family
Orton Chirwa (founder, Malawi Congress Party; political prisoner)
Vera Chirwa (wife of Orton Chirwa; human rights advocate and former presidential candidate)

The Mutharika family
Bingu wa Mutharika (President of Malawi)
Peter Mutharika (young brother of Bingu wa Mutharika; President of Malawi)

Malaysia
The Abdul Razak–Hussein Onn family
Tun Abdul Razak, Prime Minister of Malaysia (1970–76)
Rahah Noah, daughter of Mohamed Noah Omar, sister of Suhailah Noah and spouse of Tun Abdul Razak 
Dato' Sri Mohd Najib Tun Abdul Razak, Prime Minister (2009–18)
Jaafar Haji Muhammad, first Menteri Besar of Johor
Onn Jaafar, founder of United Malays National Organisation (UMNO) and Menteri Besar of Johor
Tun Hussein Onn (Prime Minister, 1976–81)
Mohamed Noah Omar father in law of Hussein Onn and Speaker of the Dewan Rakyat 
Suhailah Noah, daughter of Mohamed Noah Omar, spouse of Tun Hussein Onn and sister of Rahah Noah
Hishammuddin Hussein, Senior Minister of Defence, former Senior Minister (Security) and former Minister of Foreign Affairs, son of Hussein Onn
Tengku Marsilla Tengku Abdullah, spouse of Hishammuddin Hussein and princess of Pahang
Onn Hafiz Ghazi, nephew of Hishammuddin Hussein, Menteri Besar of Johor, former Member of the Johor State Executive Council (EXCO), Member of the Johor State Legislative Assembly (MLA) for Machap and formerly Layang-Layang
 Abdul Rahman Mohamed Yassin, brother-in-law of Onn Jaafar and first President of the Dewan Negara
Ungku Abdul Aziz, nephew of Onn Jaafar, Vice-Chancellor of the University of Malaya and 1st Director of Dewan Bahasa dan Pustaka
Syed Hussein Alatas, nephew of Onn Jaafar and Vice-Chancellor of the University of Malaya
Syed Muhammad Naquib al-Attas, nephew of Onn Jaafar and founder of the International Institute of Islamic Thought and Civilisation (ISTAC)
 Abdullah Jaafar, Menteri Besar of Johor
 Mustapha Jaafar, Menteri Besar of Johor
The Mahathir-Hasmah family

 Tun Dr. Mahathir Mohamad, Prime Minister of Malaysia (1981-2003, 2018-2020)
 Mukhriz Mahathir, Menteri Besar of Kedah (2013-2016, 2018-2020)
 Tun Dr. Siti Hasmah Mohamad Ali, spouse of Mahathir Mohamad
 Tun Ismail Mohamad Ali, brother of Siti Hasmah, second Governor of Bank Negara Malaysia

The Anwar family

 Ibrahim Abdul Rahman, father of Anwar Ibrahim, Member of Parliament of Seberang Perai Central (1959-1969)
 Anwar Ibrahim, Prime Minister of Malaysia (since 2022), Leader of the Opposition (2008-2015 & 2020-2022), Deputy Prime Minister of Malaysia (1992-1998)
 Wan Azizah Wan Ismail, Leader of the Opposition (2008 & 2015-2018), Deputy Prime Minister of Malaysia (2018-2020)
 Nurul Izzah Anwar, daughter of Anwar and Azizah, Member of Parliament of Permatang Pauh (2018-2022)

The Lim family

 Lim Kit Siang, Leader of the Opposition
 Lim Guan Eng, Minister of Finance (2018-2020), Chief Minister of Penang (2008-2018)
 Betty Chew Gek Cheng, spouse of Lim Guan Eng

Maldives
The Gayoom family (husband-wife and their close relatives)
Maumoon Abdul Gayoom (President of the Maldives 1978–2008)
Nasreena Ibrahim (First Lady)
Abdulla Hameed (Speaker of Parliament and Atoll Administrator)
Hamdhoon Hameed (Minister of Planning)
Midhath Hilmy (Minister of Science and Communications)
Ilyas Ibrahim (Minister of Transportation and Aviation)
Abdullahi Majeed (Deputy Minister for the Environment)
Ibrahim Hussain Maniku (Minister of Information)
Abdulla Yameen (Minister of Trade)

Mali
The Sidibé brothers
Mandé Sidibé (Prime Minister, 2000–02)
Modibo Sidibé (Prime Minister, 2007–11)

Malta
The Abela family
George Abela (President of Malta, 2009–14)
 Robert Abela (son) (Prime Minister of Malta. 2020–present)

The Borg Olivier family
George Borg Olivier  (Prime Minister of Malta, 1950-1955, 1962-1971)
Paul Borg Olivier  (nephew of George Borg Olivier; Secretary General of Partit Nazzjonalista 2008-2013)

The Debono Grech family
Joe Debono Grech (Deputy Leader of Partit Laburista, 1987-1992)
Joanne Debono Grech (Daughter of Joe Debono Grech, Mayor of Birkirkara, 2013-present)
The Fenech Adami family
Eddie Fenech Adami (Prime Minister of Malta, 1987–1996, 1998–2004 President of Malta, 2004–2009 Nationalist Party leader 1977–2004)
Beppe Fenech Adami (son of Eddie Fenech Adami, Nationalist Party deputy leader 2013–2017)
Micheal Fenech Adami (son of Eddie Fenech Adami, Mayor of Birkirkara, 2006-2013)

The Delia family
Adrian Delia (Leader of Partit Nazzjonalista, 2017-2020)
Anthony Delia (Brother of Adrian Delia, Local Councillor of San Pawl il-Bahar, 2019-present)

The Galea-Muscat family
Censu Galea (Minister of Food, Agriculture and Fisheries, 1994-1996, Minister of Transport and Telecommunications, 1998-2004, Deputy Speaker of Parliament, 2010-2017)
Graziella Galea (daughter of Censu Galea, Member of Parliament, 2022-present)
Joseph Muscat   (distant relative of Graziella Galea, Prime Minister of Malta,2013-2020)

The Gonzi family
Mikiel Gonzi (Archbishop of Malta, 1943-1976, Labour Party Senator 1921-1924)
Lawrence Gonzi (great grandnephew of Mikiel Gonzi, Prime Minister of Malta, 2004-2013)
Michael Gonzi  (great grandnephew of Mikiel Gonzi and brother of Lawrence Gonzi, Member of Parliament, 2008-2017)

The Grech family
Edwin Grech (Minister of Social Security, 1996-1998)
 Karin Grech (Daughter of Edwin Grech, Murdered in 1977 by a letter bomb)
Bernard Grech (Nephew of Edwin Grech, Leader of Partit Nazzjonalista, 2020-present)

The De Marco family
Guido de Marco (President of Malta, 1999–2004)
Mario de Marco (son of Guido de Marco, Minister for Environment, Tourism and Culture, 2012–2013)

The Mifsud Bonnici family
Karmenu Mifsud Bonnici (Prime Minister of Malta, 1984–87 leader of Labour Party, 1984–1992)
Ugo Mifsud Bonnici (cousin Karmenu Mifsud Bonnici; of President of Malta, 1994–99)
Carmelo Mifsud Bonnici (son of Ugo Mifsud Bonnici; Home Affairs Minister, 2008–2012, Member of Parliament, 1998-present)
Paula Mifsud Bonnici (niece of Carmelo Mifsud Bonnici; Member of Parliament 2013-2017,2022-present)

The Mintoff family
Dom Mintoff (Prime Minister of Malta, 1955–1958, 1971–1984 leader of Labour Party, 1949–1984)
Yana Mintoff (daughter of Dom Mintoff, Maltese politician)
Wenzu Mintoff (nephew of Dom Mintoff, former Labour MP and founder of Alternattiva Demokratika)

The Mizzi family
Fortunato Mizzi (leader, Nationalist Party)
Enrico Mizzi (son of Fortunato Mizzi, Prime Minister of Malta, 1950)

The Said family
Chris Said (Minister of Justice, Information and Dialogue, 2012-2013)
 Edward Said (brother of Chris, Mayor of Nadur, 2015-present)
Charles Said (brother of Chris, Mayor of Nadur, 2012-2015)

The Zerafa family
 Lydia Zerafa (First Lady of Prime Minister of Malta, 2020-present)
Alison Zerafa Civelli (Sister of Lydia Abela, Parliament Secretary for Local Government, 2022-present)

Marshall Islands
The Alik family
Alee Alik (Member of Parliament, 1979–1987)
Evlynn Konou (first cousin of Alee Alik; Member of Parliament, 1979–95)
Alik J. Alik (brother of Alee Alik; Member of Parliament 1991–2012, Vice Speaker of Parliament, 2008–12)
Jurelang Zedkaia (nephew of Alee Alik; President of the Marshall Islands, 2009–2012)
Rien J. Morris (nephew of Alee Alik; Member of Parliament, 1995–)

The Kabua family
Amata Kabua (President of the Marshall Islands, 1979–96)
 David Kabua (President of the Marshall Islands, 2020)
Imata Kabua (cousin of Amata Kabua; President of the Marshall Islands, 1997–2000)

The Note family
Nathan Note (anti-nuclear lobbyist in Bikini Atoll)
Kessai Note (nephew of Nathan Note; President of the Marshall Islands, 2000–08)
Tomaki Juda (cousin of Kessai Note; Member of Parliament 2000–, Vice Speaker of Parliament, 2012–)

Mauritius
The Jugnauth family
Sir Anerood Jugnauth(former President of Mauritius, and former Prime Minister of Mauritius)
Pravind Jugnauth (son of Anerood Jugnauth), Prime Minister of Mauritius, Leader of Militant Socialist Movement
Ashok Jugnauth (brother of Anerood Jugnauth, former minister)
Maya Hanoomanjee (niece of Anerood Jugnauth), former MP and former Speaker of the parliament

The Bérenger family
Paul Bérenger (MP, former Prime Minister of Mauritius)
Joanna Bérenger (MP)

The Boolell family
 Sir Satcam Boolell (former minister)
Arvin Boolell (son of Satcam Boolell; former minister)
Satyajit Boolell (younger son of Satcam Boolell; Director of Public Prosecution)
Satish Boolell (nephew of Satcam Boolell; former Police Chief Medical Officer and former MP)
Anil Gayan (nephew of Satcam Boolell; former minister)
Sushil Kushiram (son-in-law of Satcam Boolell; former minister)

The Duval family
Sir Gaëtan Duval (Foreign Minister, 1969–1973)
Xavier Luc Duval (son of Gaëtan Duval; Vice Prime Minister of Mauritius 2005, leader of the Mauritian Social Democratic Party)
Richard Duval (step-son of Gaëtan Duval; MP)
Hervé Duval (brother of Gaetan Duval; retired civil servant and former minister)
Ghislaine Henry (sister of Gaetan Duval; former Member of Parliament (MP) and former ambassador)
Thierry Henry (son of Ghislaine Henry; former MP)

The Guttee family
Rajnarain Guttee (former MP)
Rohitnarain Singh Guttee (former MP, younger brother of Rajnarain Guttee)

The Jeetah family
Ramnath Jeetah (former MP)
Rajesh Jeetah (former minister)

The Mohamed family
 Sir Abdool Razack Mohamed, former minister
Yousuf Mohamed (son of Abdool Razack Mohamed; former minister and lawyer)
Shakeel Mohamed (grandson of Abdool Razack Mohamed and son of Yousuf Mohamed; lawyer and former minister)

The Ramgoolam family
Sir Seewoosagur Ramgoolam (former Prime Minister of Mauritius)
Navin Ramgoolam (son of Sir Seewoosagur Ramgoolam; former Prime Minister of Mauritius)

The Seetaram family
Iswurdeo Seetaram (former MP and former Speaker)
Jangbahadoorsing Iswurdeo Mola Roopchand Seetaram (former MP)

The Uteem family
 Cassam Uteem (former President of the Republic; former minister)
Reza Uteem (son of Cassam Uteem; MP)

The Virahsawmy family
Simadree Virahsamy (former MP)
Deva Virahsawmy (former MP)

Mexico
The Abascal family (father, son)
Salvador Abascal, Leader of the National Synarchist Union
Carlos María Abascal Carranza, Secretary of the Interior 2005–06

The Ávila Camacho family (brothers)
Manuel Ávila Camacho, President of Mexico 1940–46
Maximino Ávila Camacho, Governor of Puebla 1937–41
Rafael Ávila Camacho, Governor of Puebla 1951–57

The Calderón Hinojosa family (father, children, daughter-in-law)
Luis Calderón Vega, Founder of the National Action Party (PAN).
Felipe Calderón Hinojosa, President of Mexico 2006–2012; son of Calderón Vega
Margarita Zavala de Calderón, Former PAN deputy; wife of Calderón Hinojosa
Luisa María Calderón Hinojosa, Former PAN senator; daughter of Calderón Vega
Juan Luis Calderón Hinojosa, public servant in Michoacán; son of Calderón Vega
Carmen de Fátima Calderón Hinojosa, public servant in Michoacán; daughter of Calderón Vega

The Cárdenas family (grandfather, father, son)
Lázaro Cárdenas, President of Mexico 1934–1940
Cuauhtémoc Cárdenas, Head of Government of the Federal District 1997–1999
Lázaro Cárdenas Batel, Governor of Michoacán 2002–2008

The Herrera family (grandfather, father, nephew, son)
Ernesto Herrera Ale, Mayor of Gomez Palacio, and owner of Chilchota
Jorge Herrera Caldera, Governor of the Durango (2010-2016)
Juana Leticia Herrera Ale, current mayor of Gomez Palacio

The del Mazo family (grandfather, father, nephew, son)
Alfredo del Mazo Vélez, Governor of the State of Mexico 1945–1951
Alfredo del Mazo González, Governor of the State of Mexico 1981–1986
Enrique Peña Nieto, Governor of the State of Mexico 2005–2011, President of Mexico 2012–present; also nephew of Arturo Montiel, governor of the State of Mexico 1999–2005
Alfredo del Mazo Maza, Governor of the State of Mexico 2017–present

The Madero family (father, sons)
Evaristo Madero, Governor of Coahuila
Francisco I. Madero, President of Mexico, 1911–1913
Gustavo A. Madero, Parliamentarian and revolutionary, Head of Government of the Federal District

Moreira family
Humberto Moreira Valdez (Govenor of Coahuila 2005-2011)
Rubén Moreira Valdez (Governor of Coahuila 2011-2017 )

The Obregón family (father, son)
Alvaro Obregón, President of Mexico 1920–24
Alvaro Obregón Tapia, Governor of Sonora 1955–61
The Sodi family (great-grandfather, grandfather, uncle, grandchildren)

 Carlos Sodi Candiani, senator for Oaxaca 1882–1884, senator for Michoacán for approximately 25 years
 Demetrio Sodi Guergué, president of the Supreme Court of Justice of the Nation 1908–1910, Secretary of Justice March 25, 1911–May 25, 1911; son of Carlos
 Carlos Franco Sodi, Attorney General of the Republic 1952–1956; nephew of Demetrio
 Demetrio Sodi de la Tijera, federal deputy 1998–1991 and 1997–2000, senator for Mexico City 2000–2006, head of Miguel Hidalgo borough 2009–2012; grandson of Demetrio
 Gabriela Sodi Miranda, federal deputy 2021–present; granddaughter of Demetrio

Montserrat
The Bramble family
William Henry Bramble (Chief Minister of Montserrat, 1960–70)
Percival Austin Bramble (son of William Henry Bramble; Chief Minister of Montserrat, 1970–78)

Mozambique
The Mandela family (South Africa) and Machel family
Samora Machel – President of Mozambique (1975–83); first husband of Graça Machel
Graça Machel – First Lady of Mozambique (1975–83) and South Africa (1998–99); widow of Samoa Machel; 3rd wife of Nelson Mandela
Nelson Mandela – President of South Africa (1994–1999)
Winnie Madikizela-Mandela – political activist; 2nd wife of Nelson Mandela

The Guebuza-Dai family (brothers-in-law)
Armando Guebuza, President (2005–15)
Tobias Joaquim Dai, Defense Minister (2000–08)

Namibia
The Nujoma family (father-son)
Sam Nujoma (President of Namibia, 1990–2005)
Utoni Nujoma (Foreign minister)

Nauru
The Adeang family
Kennan Adeang (President of Nauru, 1986 and 1996)
David Adeang (son of Kennan Adeang; Finance Minister, 2004–07 and 2011–)

The Detudamo family
Timothy Detudamo Head Chief of Nauru
Buraro Detudamo (son of Timothy Detudamo, Chief and Island Councilor, Member of Parliament, 1968–92)

The Dowiyogo family
Bernard Dowiyogo (President of Nauru, 1976–78, 1989–95, 1996, 1998–99, 2000–01 and 2003)
Valdon Dowiyogo (son of Bernard Dowiyogo; Member of Parliament, Speaker of Parliament)
"Wawani Dowiyogo (Son of Valdon Dowiyogo; Member of Parliament)

The Keke-Stephen family
Ludwig Adowong Keke (Member of Parliament, 1968–73, 1989–92)
Leo Adepagadogi Keke (brother of Ludwig Keke; Member of Parliament, 1976–80)
Kieren Keke (son of Ludwig Keke; Member of Parliament, Minister for Health)
Lawrence Stephen (brother-in-law to Ludwig and Leo Keke Member of Parliament, 1971–77, 1980–1986)
Marcus Stephen (son of Lawrence Stephen; Member of Parliament, 2003–07, President of Nauru, 2007–)

The Kun family
Ruben James Tullen Kun (Member of Parliament, 1971–92)
Roland Kun (son of Ruben Kun; Member of Parliament, 2003–, Minister for Justice)
Russell Kun (cousin of Roland Kun; Member of Parliament, 2003–2004)

Nepal

The Basnyat dynasty
 Shivaram Singh Basnyat (Senapati Badabir)
 Naahar Singh Basnyat (Kaji)
 Kehar Singh Basnyat (Kaji) married Chitrawati Devi, daughter of Kalu Pande.
 Kirtiman Singh Basnyat (Mulkaji)
 Bakhtawar Singh Basnyat (Mulkaji)
 Abhiman Singh Basnyat (Mulkaji)
 Dhokal Singh Basnyat (Governor)

The Pande dynasty

 Ganesh Pandey (Kaji of Gorkha)
 Kalu Pande (Kaji of Gorkha), descendant of Ganesh Pande
 Bamsa Raj Pandey (Dewankaji)
 Damodar Pande (Mulkaji)
 Rana Jang Pande (Mukhtiyar)
Bhim Bahadur Pande, seventh descendant of Kalu Pande 
Prithvi Bahadur Pande, son of Bhim Bahadur

The Rana dynasty
Ram Krishna Kunwar
Bal Narsingh Kunwar, grandson of Ram Krishna 
Jung Bahadur Rana
Bam Bahadur Kunwar
Ranodip Singh Kunwar
Bir Shamsher Jang Bahadur Rana, nephew of Jung Bahadur Rana
Dev Shamsher Jang Bahadur Rana, nephew of Jung Bahadur Rana
Chandra Shamsher Jang Bahadur Rana
Mohan Shamsher Jang Bahadur Rana
Pashupati Shamsher Jang Bahadur Rana, grandson of Mohan Shamsher
Baber Shamsher Jang Bahadur Rana
Udaya Shumsher Rana, great-grandson of Baber
Kaiser Shamsher Jang Bahadur Rana
Bhim Shamsher Jang Bahadur Rana
Padma Shamsher Jang Bahadur Rana
Subarna Shamsher Rana, nephew of Padma Shamsher
Juddha Shumsher Jung Bahadur Rana
Kiran Shamsher Rana

The Thapa dynasty

 Bir Bhadra Thapa (Kaji)
 Amar Singh Thapa (Sardar) (Sanukaji)
 Bhimsen Thapa (Mukhtiyar)
Nain Singh Thapa (General Kaji)
Queen Tripurasundari of Nepal
Ujir Singh Thapa (Colonel Kaji)
Mathabar Singh Thapa (PM C-in-C)
Bhaktabar Singh Thapa (Colonel Kaji)
Ranabir Singh Thapa (General Kaji)

The Koirala family
Krishna Prasad Koirala 
Matrika Prasad Koirala (brother of Bishweshwar Prasad Koirala; Prime Minister of Nepal, 1951–52 and 1953–55)
Bishweshwar Prasad Koirala (Prime Minister of Nepal, 1959–60)
Girija Prasad Koirala (brother of Bishweshwar Prasad Koirala; Prime Minister of Nepal, 1991–94, 1998–99, and 2000–01)
Sujata Koirala (daughter of Girija Prasad Koirala; vice Prime Minister of Nepal 2009–10)
Connected Member
Sushil Koirala (Prime Minister of Nepal, 2014–15; cousin of B.P., Girija)
Shailaja Acharya (former Deputy Prime Minister of Nepal; niece of Matrika, B.P. and Girija)

The Netherlands
The Donner family
 Johannes Hendricus Donner (1824–1903, member of House of Representatives from 1880 to 1901)
 Jan Donner (1891–1981, Minister of Justice 1926–33), grandson of Johannes Hendricus Donner
 André Donner (1918–92, member of the state committee on revising the Constitution 1950–54, chairman of the state committee on revising the Constitution 1967–71), son of Jan Donner
 Piet Hein Donner (born 1948, Member of the Council of State 1997–2002, minister from 2002 to 2012, current Vice-President of the Council of State), son of André Donner

The Regout family
 Petrus Dominicus Regout (1801–78, member of Senate 1849–59)
 Hubert Gérard Louis Regout (1832–1905, member of Senate 1881–1904), son of Petrus Dominicus Regout
 Louis Hubert Willem Regout (1861–1915, member of Senate 1904–09 and 1909–13, Minister of Water 1909–13, Dutch delegate to the Holy See from July 1915 to his death in October 1915), son of Hubert Gérard Louis Regout, brother of Robert Regout
Ludovicus Franciscus Hubertus Regout (1891–1966, member of Senate 1948–63), son of Louis Hubert Willem Regout
 Robert Regout (1863–1913, member of House of Representatives 1905–10, Minister of Justice 1910–13), son of Hubert Gérard Louis Regout

New Zealand
The Allen family (grandfather-grandson)
 William Shepherd Allen – Member of Parliament 1890–91 for Te Aroha.
John Manchester Allen – Member of Parliament 1938–41 for Hauraki. Grandson of William.

The Ardern family (cousins)
 Shane Ardern – Member of Parliament (1998–2014) for Taranaki–King Country.
Jacinda Ardern – Member of Parliament (2008–present), Prime Minister (2017–present), cousin of Shane

The Armstrong family (father-son)
Tim Armstrong – Christchurch City Councilor 1919–25, 1927–29, Member of Parliament 1922–1939
Tommy Armstrong – Member of Parliament 1943–1951, Christchurch City Councilor 1929–35, 1962–65, son of Tim

The Atmore–Baigent family (brothers-in-law)
Harry Atmore – Member of Parliament for Nelson 1911–46 and Minister of Education 1928–31. Member of Nelson City Council 1905. Harry Atmore was the son-in-law of James Corrigan Member of Parliament for Patea 1922–25. Brother-in-law of Henry
Henry Baigent – Mayor of Nelson 1901–04 and 1905–06 and Nelson City Councilor 1893–1901

The Barclay family (father-son-cousin)
Jim Barclay – Member of Parliament 1935–43 for Marsden and Minister of Agriculture 1941–43
Bruce Barclay – Member of Parliament 1969–79 for Christchurch Central
Ron Barclay – Member of Parliament 1966–75 for New Plymouth. Deputy Mayor of New Plymouth District Council

The Bell family (father-son-grandsons)
Sir Dillon Bell – Speaker 1871–75. Son-in-law Scobie Mackenzie Member of Parliament for Mt. Ida 1884–93 and Dunedin 1896–99
Sir Francis Bell – Prime Minister 1925, son of Sir Dillon
William Bell – Member of Parliament 1911–14, son of Sir Francis
Cheviot Bell – Member of Legislative Council 1950, son of Sir Francis and brother of William

The Brandon family (father-son)
Alfred Brandon, Sr. – Member of Parliament for Wellington Country 1858–81 and Legislative Council 1883–86
Alfred Brandon, Jr. – Mayor of Wellington 1893–94 and Wellington City Councilor 1886–91

The Bridges–O'Connor family (brothers-in-law)
Simon Bridges – Member of Parliament (2008–2022), Leader of the Opposition (2018–2020), Cabinet Minister
Simon O'Connor – Member of Parliament (2011–present), married to Bridges' sister Rachel

The Brown–Garrick–Peacock–Webb family (brothers-in-law)
John Thomas Peacock, MP 1868–1873, MLC 1873–1905
John Evans Brown, MP 1871–1879 and 1881–1884, married Peacock's sister Theresa Australia
Francis James Garrick, MP 1884–1887, married Peacock's sister Elizabeth
Henry Richard Webb, MP 1873–1875, married Peacock's sister Augusta Ann

The Carter–Doocey family (father-son-nephew/grandson)
Maurice Carter – Christchurch City Councilor (1956–89), Canterbury Regional Councilor (1989–95)
David Carter – Member of Parliament (1994–2020), Cabinet Minister, Speaker (2013–17), son of Maurice
Matt Doocey - Member of Parliament (2014–present), grandson of Maurice and nephew of David

The Connelly family (father-son)
Michael Connelly – Member of Legislative Council 1936–1950
Mick Connelly – Member of Parliament 1956–84 and Cabinet Minister, son of Michael

The Courtney–Williams family (great-grandfather and great-grandson)
Thomas Williams – Christchurch City Councilor and Gore Borough Councilor 19th Century
Mel Courtney – Nelson City Councilor and Member of Parliament for Nelson 1976–81

The Douglas family (father-sons)
Norman Douglas – Member of Parliament 1960–75 and son-in-law of Member of Parliament Bill Anderton
Sir Roger Douglas – Member of Parliament 1969–90, 2008–11, Minister of Finance (1984–88) and founder of the ACT Party 1995, son of Norman
Malcolm Douglas – Member of Parliament 1978–79, son of Norman and brother of Sir Roger

The Field family (brothers-cousin)
Henry Field – Member of Parliament for Otaki 1896–99
William Field – Member of Parliament for Otaki 1900–1935, brother of Henry
Tom Field – Member of Parliament for Nelson 1914–19, cousin to Henry and William

The Fisher family (father-son)
George Fisher – Member of Parliament for Wellington 1884–90 and Mayor of Wellington
Frank Fisher – Member of Parliament for Wellington 1905–14, son of George

The Fraser family (husband-wife)
Peter Fraser – Member of Parliament 1918–50, Prime Minister 1940–49.
Janet Fraser – Member of the Wellington Hospital Board 1925–35, wife of Peter

The Fraser family (husband-wife)
Bill Fraser – Member of Parliament 1957–81
Dorothy Fraser – Chair of the Otago Hospital Board 1974–86, wife of Bill
Both were members of the Dunedin City Council

The Fraser–Cullen family (wife-husband)
Anne Fraser – Member of Parliament for East Cape 1984–90
Michael Cullen – Member of Parliament (1981-2009), Deputy Prime Minister, husband of Anne

The Gerard family (father-son)
Geoff Gerard – Member of Parliament 1943–69 for Mid-Canterbury and Ashburton
Jim Gerard – Member of Parliament 1984–97 for Rangiora. Mayor of Waimakariri 2001–07 and Waimakariri District Councillor 2010–

The Gill–Mitchell family (grandfather-grandson)
Frank Gill – Member of Parliament (1969–80), Cabinet Minister, Ambassador to the United States (1980–82)
Mark Mitchell – Member of Parliament (2011–present), Cabinet Minister, grandson of Frank

The Graham family (great-grandfather-great-grandsons/brothers)
Robert Graham – Member of Parliament 1855–68
Doug Graham – Member of Parliament 1984–1999 for Remuera and Cabinet Minister
Kennedy Graham – List Member of Parliament 2008–2017, brother of Doug

The Grigg family (husband-wife-husband-great-granddaughter)
Arthur Grigg – Member of Parliament 1938–41 for Mid-Canterbury
Mary Grigg – Member of Parliament 1942–43 for his seat after he was killed in World War II. Her grandfathers were Premier Sir John Hall, MP 1855–60 and 1866–93, and John Cracroft Wilson, MP 1866–70 and 1872–75. She married William Polson (Member of Parliament 1928–46) in 1943.
Nicola Grigg – Member of Parliament 2020–present for Selwyn, great-granddaughter of Arthur and Mary

The Hamilton brothers
Adam Hamilton – Member of Parliament for Wallace 1919–22 and 1925–46. Leader of the Opposition 1936–40
John Hamilton – Member of Parliament for Awarua 1919–22 and 1925–28, brother of Adam

The Hanan family (uncle-nephew)
Josiah Hanan – Member of Parliament for Invercargill 1899–1925 and Cabinet Minister. Mayor of Invercargill 1896–1897
Ralph Hanan – Member of Parliament for Invercargill 1946–69 and Cabinet Minister, Mayor of Invercargill 1938–1941, nephew of Josiah

The Hay family (father-son)
Sir James Hay – Christchurch City Councilor 1944–53
Sir Hamish Hay – Mayor of Christchurch 1974–89, son of Sir James

The Henare family (great-grandfather/great-grandsons)
Tau Henare – Member of Parliament (1914–38)
Tau Henare, Jr. – Member of Parliament (1993–99 & 2005–2014) and Cabinet Minister (1996–99), great-grandson of Tau Henare
Peeni Henare - Member of Parliament (2014–present) and Cabinet Minister, great-grandson of Tau Henare and cousin of Tau Jr.

The Hislop family (father-son)
Thomas Hislop, Sr. – Member of Parliament and Cabinet Minister. Mayor of Wellington 1905–1908
Thomas Hislop, Jr. – Mayor of Wellington 1931–44 and High Commissioner to Canada 1950–57

The Holland family (father-son-grandson)
Henry Holland – Member of Parliament 1925–35 for Christchurch North and Mayor of Christchurch
Sir Sidney Holland – Leader of the New Zealand National Party and Prime Minister of New Zealand (1949–57)
Eric Holland – Cabinet Minister (1975–78), son of Sir Sidney.

The Holyoake family (father/son-in-law)
Keith Holyoake – Member of Parliament 1932–38 (Motueka) and 1943–77 (Pahiatua) and Prime Minister
Ken Comber – Member of Parliament 1972–81, married Diane Holyoake daughter of Keith

The Howard family (father-daughter)
Ted Howard – Member of Parliament (1919–39)
Mabel Howard – Member of Parliament (1943–69) and Cabinet Minister. Member of Christchurch City Council. Daughter of Ted

The Hutchison family (father-son)
William Hutchison Member of Parliament 1879–84 and 1890–96. Mayor of Wellington
George Hutchison – Member of Parliament 1887–1901, son of William

The Izard family (father-son)
Charles Beard Izard – Member of Parliament from 1887 to 1890
Charles Hayward Izard – Member of Parliament from 1905 to 1908, son of Charles Beard

The Jeffries brothers
John Jeffries – Wellington City Councillor 1962–74, Deputy Mayor 1971–74
Bill Jeffries – Wellington City Councillor 1974–80, Member of Parliament for Heretaunga 1981–90, brother of John

The Kirk family (father-son-great-niece)
Norman Kirk – Member of Parliament (1957–1974) and Prime Minister
John Kirk – Member of Parliament (1974–84), son of Norman
Jo Luxton – Member of Parliament (2017–present), great-niece of Norman

The Lange–Bassett family (Bassett was a cousin of Lange)
David Lange – Prime Minister of New Zealand (1984–89)
Michael Bassett – Member of Parliament (1972–75, 1978–90) and Cabinet Minister (1984–90), cousin of David

The Lee family (father-daughter)
Graeme Lee – Member of Parliament (1981–96) and Cabinet Minister
Denise Lee – Member of Parliament (2017–20), Auckland Councilor (2013–17), daughter of Graeme

The Levin family (father-son)
Nathaniel Levin – Member of Legislative Council 1869–71
William Levin – Member of Parliament for Wellington 1879–84, son of Nathaniel

The Luxton family (father-son)
Jack Luxton – Member of Parliament for Piako (seat renamed Matamata) 1966–87
John Luxton – Member of Parliament for Matamata 1987–99 and Cabinet Minister 1990–99, son of Jack

The McCombs family (husband-wife-son)
James McCombs – Member of Parliament (1913–1933)
Elizabeth McCombs – first woman Member of Parliament (1933–1935)
Terry McCombs – Member of Parliament (1935–51) and Cabinet Minister, son of James and Elizabeth
All three were members of Christchurch City Council.

The MacIntyre family (father-son)
Duncan MacIntyre – Deputy Prime Minister
Hamish MacIntyre – Member of Parliament 1990–93, son of Duncan

The Mackenzie family (father-son)
Sir Thomas Mackenzie – Prime Minister 1912. Member of Parliament 1887 to 1896 and 1900 to 1912 and Cabinet Minister. High Commissioner in London 1912–20.
Sir Clutha Mackenzie – Member of Parliament 1921–22 for Auckland East. Became blind at the age of 20 as a result of action at Gallipoli 1915. Sir Clutha was the son-in-law of Rt. Hon. George Forbes. Son of Sir Thomas

The Mackey family (mother-daughter)
Janet Mackey – Member of Parliament for East Coast (1996–2005)
Moana Mackey – List Member of Parliament (2003–14), daughter of Janet

The Maher–McCready family (father/son-in-law)
Jimmy Maher – Member of Parliament (1946–60)
Allan McCready – Member of Parliament (1960–78), Cabinet Minister, husband of Maher's daughter Grace

The Mason–Wilford family (grandfather-grandson)
Thomas Mason – Member of Parliament for Hutt 1879–84
Thomas Wilford – Member of Parliament for Hutt 1896–1929, grandson of Thomas and son-in-law of Sir George McLean, Member of Parliament for Waikouaiti 1871–81

The Massey family (father-two sons)
Bill Massey – Member of Parliament 1894–1925 and Prime Minister 1912–25
Walter Massey – Member of Parliament for Hauraki 1931–35, son of Bill
Jack Massey – Member of Parliament for Franklin 1928–35 and 1938–57, son of Bill and brother of Walter

The McClay family (father-son)
Roger McClay – Member of Parliament 1981–96 and Cabinet Minister
Todd McClay – Member of Parliament 2008–present, Cabinet Minister, son of Roger

The McMillan family (husband-wife)
Dr Gervan McMillan – Member of Parliament 1935–43 for Dunedin West and Cabinet Minister. Member of Dunedin City Council
Ethel McMillan – Member of Parliament 1953–75 for Dunedin North, wife of Gervan

The Montgomery family (father-son)
William Montgomery Sr. – Member of Parliament for Akaroa 1874–87 and Minister of Education
William Montgomery Jr. – Member of Parliament for Ellesmere 1893–99

The Moss family (father-son)
Frederick Moss – Member of Parliament for Parnell 1876–90
Edward Moss – Member of Parliament for Ohinemuri 1902–05, son of Frederick

The Myers–Baume family (cousins)
Frederick Baume – Member of Parliament for Auckland East
Arthur Myers – elected Member of Parliament for Auckland East after Baume died. Mayor of Auckland

The Nash family (great-grandfather-great-grandson)
Sir Walter Nash – Member of Parliament 1929–68 and Prime Minister
Stuart Nash – Member of Parliament 2008–11, 2014–present and Cabinet Minister

The Nordmeyer family (father-in-law & son-in-law)
Sir Arnold Nordmeyer – Member of Parliament 1935–69 and Cabinet Minister. Leader of the Opposition 1963–65
Jim Edwards – Member of Parliament for Napier 1954–66, husband of Alison Nordmeyer and son-in-law of Sir Arnold

The O'Connor family (cousins)
Damien O'Connor – Member of Parliament (1993–2008, 2009–present), Cabinet Minister
Greg O'Connor – Member of Parliament (2017–present), cousin of Damien

The O'Flynn family (father-son)
Francis Edward O'Flynn Member of the New Zealand Legislative Council 1937–42
Frank O'Flynn Member of Parliament 1972–75, and 1978–87

The Ormond–Wilson family (grandfathers-grandsons)
James Wilson – Member of Parliament 1881–96
John Ormond – Member of Parliament 1861–90
Ormond Wilson – Member of Parliament 1935–38 and 1946–49, grandson of James and John
Tiaki Omana – Member of Parliament for Eastern Maori 1943–63, grandson of John

The Paikea family (father-son)
Paraire Paikea – Member of Parliament for Northern Maori 1938–43
Tapihana Paikea – Member of Parliament for Northern Maori 1943–63, son of Paraire

The Parata family (father-son-descendant)
Tame Parata – Member of Parliament for Southern Maori 1885–1911
Taare Parata – Member of Parliament for Southern Maori 1911–18, son of Tame
Hekia Parata – Member of Parliament 2008–17 and Cabinet Minister, descendant of Tame and Taare

The Peters family (brothers)
Ian Peters – National Party Member of Parliament for Tongariro (1990–1993)
Jim Peters – New Zealand First Member of Parliament (2002–2005)
Winston Peters – Leader of New Zealand First; Deputy Prime Minister of New Zealand (1996–98, 2017–20)

The Pharazyn family (father-son)
Charles Johnson Pharazyn – Member of Legislative Council (1869–85)
Robert Pharazyn – Member of Parliament for Rangitikei (1865–66) and Legislative Council (1885–96)

The Ratana–Rurawhe family (brothers, wife, grandson)
Toko Ratana – Member of Parliament 1935–1944, succeeded by his younger brother
Matiu Ratana – Member of Parliament 1944–1949, succeeded by his wife
Iriaka Rātana – Member of Parliament 1949–69 (all for Western Maori)
Adrian Rurawhe – Member of Parliament for Te Tai Hauauru (successor electorate to Western Maori) 2014–present, Speaker (2022–present), grandson of Matiu and Iriaka

The Reeves brothers
Charles Reeves – Mayor of Dunedin 1876–77 and Dunedin City Councillor 1873–76
Richard Reeves – Member of Parliament for Grey Valley and Inangahua 1878–1893 and Legislative Council 1895–1910 (Speaker 1895), brother of Charles

The Reeves family (father-son)
William Reeves – Member of Parliament 1867–1868 & 1871–1875
William Pember Reeves – Member of Parliament 1887–1896 and Minister of Labour 1891–1896, son of William

The Rhodes family (brothers, father-son-cousin)
William Barnard Rhodes – Member of Parliament 1853–55 & 1858–66
Robert Heaton Rhodes – Member of Parliament 1871–74, William's brother
Sir Heaton Rhodes – Member of Parliament 1899–1925 and a Cabinet Minister
Arthur Rhodes – Member of Parliament and Mayor of Christchurch

The Richardson–Pearce family (Richardson was Pearce's great-granddaughter)
George Pearce – Member of Parliament for Patea 1908–19
Ruth Richardson – Member of Parliament for Selwyn 1981–1994 and Minister of Finance

The Richmond–Atkinson family (brothers, relation by marriage)
James Richmond – Member of Parliament 1860–1870 and a Cabinet Minister, and his brother
William Richmond – Member of Parliament 1855–62 and a Cabinet Minister
Harry Atkinson – Member of Parliament 1861–91 and Premier several times, related by marriage
Arthur Atkinson – Member of Parliament 1899–1902, nephew of Harry

The Rolleston family (father-sons)
William Rolleston – Provincial Superintendent, Member of Parliament and Cabinet Minister
Frank Rolleston – Member of Parliament for Timaru 1922–28 and Cabinet Minister, son of William
John Rolleston – Member of Parliament for Waitomo 1922–28, son of William and brother of Frank

The Seddon family (father-son-daughter)
Richard Seddon – Prime Minister of New Zealand (1893–1906)
Tom Seddon – Member of Parliament for Westland 1906–22 and 1925–28, son of Richard
Elizabeth Gilmer – Wellington City Councilor 1941–53, daughter of Richard

The Semple family (husband-wife)
Bob Semple – Member of Parliament 1918–19, 1928–54 and Cabinet Minister.
Margaret Semple – Wellington City Councilor 1938–41, wife of Bob

The Sidey family (father-son)
Sir Thomas Sidey – Member of Parliament for Caversham and Dunedin South 1901–28, Cabinet Minister and Member of Legislative Council 1928–33
Sir Stuart Sidey – Mayor of Dunedin 1959–65 and Dunedin City Councilor 1947–83

The Smith family (father-son)
Edward Smith – Member of Parliament 1890–96 and 1899–1907
Sydney Smith – Member of Parliament 1918–25 and 1928–38 and Cabinet Minister, son of Edward

The Smith family (father-son)
J. Valentine Smith – Member of Parliament 1855–1858
Harold Smith – Member of Parliament 1916–1919, son of J. Valentine

The Stewart family (father-son)
William Downie Stewart Sr – Member of Parliament Dunedin West 19th Century
William Downie Stewart Jr – Member of Parliament 1914–1935 Dunedin West, Minister of Finance 1931–1933 and Mayor of Dunedin 1913–1914

The Sutton family (brothers)
Jim Sutton – Member of Parliament (1984–90, 1993–2006) and Cabinet Minister (1990, 1999–2006)
Bill Sutton – Member of Parliament (1984–90), brother of Jim

The Tamihere–Waititi family (father/son-in-law)
John Tamihere – Labour Member of Parliament (1999–2005), Cabinet Minister,  Māori Party Co-leader (2020)
Rawiri Waititi – Māori Party Member of Parliament and Co-leader (2020–present), married to Tamihere's daughter Kiri

The Taylor family (father-son)
Tommy Taylor – Member of Parliament and Mayor of Christchurch 1911
Ted Taylor – Christchurch City Councilor 1968–71, son of Tommy

The Tirikatene family (father-daughter-nephew/grandson)
Sir Eruera Tirikatene – Member of Parliament (1932–67) and Cabinet Minister (1943–49, 1957–60)
Whetu Tirikatene-Sullivan – Member of Parliament (1967–96) and Cabinet Minister (1972–75), daughter of Sir Eruera
Rino Tirikatene – Member of Parliament 2011–present, grandson of Sir Eruera and nephew of Whetu

The Tizard family (husband-wife; parents-daughter)
Bob Tizard – Member of Parliament (1957–60 and 1963–90), Deputy Prime Minister and Minister of Finance (1974–75)
Dame Catherine Tizard – Mayor of Auckland (1983–90) and Governor-General of New Zealand (1990–95), ex-wife of Bob
Judith Tizard – Member of Parliament (1993–2008) and Minister, daughter of Bob and Dame Catherine

The Uru brothers
Hopere Uru – Member of Parliament for Southern Maori 1918–21
Henare Uru – Member of Parliament for Southern Maori 1922–28, brother of Hopere

The Wakefield family (father-son-nephew)
Edward Gibbon Wakefield (1796–1862) – Member of Parliament
Jerningham Wakefield (1820–79) – Member of Parliament
Edward Wakefield (1845–1924) – nephew, son of brother Felix Wakefield, Member of Parliament
Edward Stafford (1819–1901) Member of Parliament and Premier, married niece Emily, daughter of brother William Wakefield

The Walls family (grandfather-grandson)
Robert Walls – MP for Dunedin North 1945-53
Richard Walls – MP for Dunedin North 1975–78, Mayor of Dunedin 1989–95, grandson of Robert

The Ward family (father-son)
Sir Joseph Ward – (1887–1930) Member of Parliament and Premier/Prime Minister
Vincent Ward – (1930–31) Member of Parliament, son of Sir Joseph

The Wetere–Mahuta family (uncle-niece)
Koro Wētere – Member of Parliament 1969–96 and Cabinet Minister
Nanaia Mahuta – Member of Parliament 1996–present and Cabinet Minister, niece of Koro

The Wilkinson–McLay family (half-brothers)
Peter Wilkinson – Member of Parliament (1969–84), Cabinet Minister
Jim McLay – Member of Parliament (1975–87), Leader of the Opposition (1984–86), Cabinet Minister, half-brother of Peter

The Young–Bradford family (father-daughter-son/brother-in-law)
Bill Young – Member of Parliament 1966–81 and Cabinet Minister
Annabel Young – Member of Parliament 1997–2002, daughter of Bill
Max Bradford – Member of Parliament 1990–2002 and Cabinet Minister, married to Bill's daughter Rosemary

The Young family (father-son)
Venn Young – Member of Parliament 1966 to 1990 and Cabinet Minister
Jonathan Young – Member of Parliament for New Plymouth 2008–20, son of Venn

Nicaragua
The Argüello family
 Juan Argüello del Castillo y Guzmán, (1778–1830), Deputy Head of State 1826–7; Head of State 1827–9, son of Narciso Jose Argüello y Monsivais (Cadiz, Spain, 1714-Granada, Nicaragua 1771). Narciso Jose, with his older brother Diego Nicolas Argüello y Monsivais (1706–1770), are the founders of the Argüello family in Nicaragua. 
 Jose Argüello Arce (1821–1897), President of Congress, 1865–6, 1877–79, great grandson of Diego Nicolas Argüello y Monsivais. 
 Angélica Balladares de Argüello,(1872–1973). 1st Lady of the Liberal Party, 1925–1973; Pres.of the Nicaraguan Feminist League 1931–1937; UAW's "Woman of the Americas, Nicaragua Chapter",1959; Congressional Gold Medal 1969 laureate, wife of Guillermo Argüello Vargas. 
Leonardo Argüello Barreto,(1875–1947) Interior, Education and Foreign Minister; President of Nicaragua, 1947, direct descendant of Narciso Jose Argüello y Monsivais.
 Guillermo Argüello Vargas, grandson of José Argüello Arce; Minister of Education, 1924–26, Minister of Finance 1928–32; spouse of Angelica Balladares de Argüello
 Mariano Argüello Vargas (1890–1970) grandson of José Argüello Arce; President of Congress 1937, 1950, 1965; Foreign Minister 1939–41, and 1943–46; Vice-President, 1947 
 Alejandro Argüello Montiel, (1917-1997) Deputy Head of Congress (1946-8),  Signatary of Inter-American Treaty of Reciprocal Assistance (Rio Treaty, TIAR. 1947)   first cousin of Alejandro Montiel Arguello and direct descendant of Diego Nicolas Arguello y Monsivais. 
 Alejandro Montiel Argüello (1917–2012), Foreign Minister, 1959–63 and 1971–78, nephew of Mariano Argüello Vargas and direct descendant of both Narciso Jose and Diego Nicolas Argüello y Monsivais. 
 Guillermo Argüello Poessy Vice Minister of Foreign Affairs, 2000, Pres. GAO, Comptroller, 2001–2014; nephew of Guillermo Argüello Vargas and great-grandson of José Argüello Arce;
Carlos Argüello Gómez (born 1946) Justice Minister 1979–83, Chief Nicaraguan Negotiator and Ambassador to the UN World Court in the Hague, Netherlands, from 1983 to present and direct descendant of both Narciso Jose and Diego Nicolas Argüello y Monsivais. 
 Bertha Marina Argüello Roman (de Rizo), Vice Minister of Family (2000) and of Foreign Affairs (2002), daughter of Guillermo Argüello Poessy. 
 Silvio Argüello Cardenal, Vice-President, 1963–67, direct descendant of Narciso Jose Argüello y Monsivais.
 Mariángeles Argüello Robelo, Health Minister, 2000–02 direct descendant of Narciso Jose Argüello y Monsivais.
 Alejandro Argüello Choisell, Minister of Public Works, Industry & Commerce, 2005–2007. direct descendant of Narciso Jose Argüello y Monsivais.
 Noel Vidaurre Arguello, (1955–) Vice Minister of Finance and Economy 1990–1992, direct descendant of Narciso Jose Argüello y Monsivais.

The Chamorro family

The Sacasa family
Roberto Sacasa Sarria, President of Nicaragua, 1889–91 and 1891–93
Juan Bautista Sacasa Sacasa, son of Pres. Roberto Sacasa Sarria, President of Nicaragua, 1933–36
Crisanto Sacasa Sacasa, nephew of Pres. Roberto Sacasa Sarria, Education Minister, 1933 and 1955
Oscar Sevilla-Sacasa, grandson of Pres. Roberto Sacasa Sarria, Foreign Minister
Guillermo Sevilla-Sacasa, grandson of Pres. Roberto Sacasa Sarria, Acting President of Nicaragua, 1936
Benjamín Lacayo Sacasa, Pres. of Nicaragua, 1947
Ramiro Sacasa Guerrero, Secretary of the Presidency, Labour Minister, 1953–5; Education Minister, 1966–8
Noel Sacasa Cruz, great-grandson of Pres. Roberto Sacasa Sarria, Economy, Industry & Commerce Minister, 1999–2001
Esteban Duque-Estrada Sacasa, great-grandson of Pres. Roberto Sacasa Sarria, Minister of Finance, 1999–2001
Francisco Xavier Aguirre Sacasa, great-grandson of Roberto Sacasa Sarria, Foreign Minister, 2000–2002

The Ortega-Murillo family
Daniel Ortega, President of Nicaragua (1979–90; 2007–)
Rosario Murillo, First Lady and Vice President of Nicaragua (2017–)

The Somoza family
Anastasio Somoza García President of Nicaragua, Head of State, 1934–56
Luis Somoza Debayle, son of Pres. Anastasio Somoza García, grandson of Pres. Roberto Sacasa Sarria (see Sacasa family); President of Nicaragua, 1956–63
Anastasio Somoza Debayle, son of Pres. Anastasio Somoza García, grandson of Pres. Roberto Sacasa Sarria (see Sacasa family); President of Nicaragua, 1967–72 and 1974–79

Niger
The Diori family (cousins)
Diori Hamani (President)
Djibo Bakary (independence leader)

The Kountché family (cousins)
Seyni Kountché (former military President)
Ali Saibou (former military President)

Nigeria
The Abubakar Olusola Saraki family (father, son, daughter)
Abubakar Olusola Saraki 1979–1983: Senate Leader in Nigerian Senate
Abubakar Olubukola Saraki 2003–2007 and 2007–2011: Governor of Kwara State, 2011–2019 : Senator in Nigerian Senate, 2015–2019: Senate President, under trial at code of conduct tribunal over no-disclosure of assets
Gbemisola Ruqayyah Saraki 1999–2003: Member of Nigerian House of Representatives, 2003–2007: Senator in Nigerian Senate, 2007–2011: Senator in Nigerian Senate, 2011

The Awolowo family and the Osibanjo family (grandfather-in-law, grandson-in-law)
 Obafemi Awolowo, political activist and politician, premier of the Western Region, Leader of the Opposition in the Federal Parliament 
 Yemi Osibanjo, lawyer and politician, Vice-President

The Ironsi family (father, son)

 Johnson Aguiyi-Ironsi January–July 1966: Nigerian military head of state
 Thomas Aguiyi Ironsi 2004–2007: Minister of Defense, 2001–2004: Nigerian Ambassador to Togo

The Onyeama family (father, son)

Charles Dadi Onyeama 1964–1967: Justice of the Supreme Court of Nigeria
Geoffrey Jideofor Kwusike Onyeama 2015–2019: Nigeria's Minister for Foreign Affairs, 2019 (incumbent): Nigeria's Minister for Foreign Affairs.

North Macedonia 
The Crvenkovski family (father-son)
Krste Crvenkovski (Secretary of the League of Communists of Macedonia)
Stevo Crvenkovski (Foreign minister)

Norway
The Stoltenberg family
All members of the family are associated with the Norwegian Labour Party
Thorvald Stoltenberg (1998–2008: President of the Norwegian Red Cross, 1996–99: Ambassador to Denmark, 1987–89 and 1990–93: Minister of Foreign Affairs), 1990: UN High Commissioner for Refugees, 1979–1981: Minister of Defense.
Karin Stoltenberg (wife of Thorvald Stoltenberg) 1986–1987 Junior minister of Trade and Shipping, 1987–88 Junior minister of Business Affairs.
Jens Stoltenberg (son of Thorvald Stoltenberg and Karin Stoltenberg) (2000–01, 2005–13 Prime Minister 1993–96 Minister of Trade and Energy 1996–97 Minister Finance and Customs) Leader of the Labour Party 2002–2014, 13th Secretary General of the North Atlantic Treaty Organization 2014–present
Ingrid Schulerud (married to Jens Stoltenberg) (has a high-profile diplomatic position in the Norwegian Ministry of Foreign Affairs) (21st Norwegian Ambassador to Belgium 2015–present)
Johan Jørgen Holst (Thorvald Stoltenberg's brother-in-law, [married to Karin's sister]) (1993–94 Minister of Foreign Affairs and known for leading peace negotiations in the Middle East. 1987–89 and 1991–93 Minister of Defense.)
Anne-Catharina Vestly (Ingrid Schulerud aunt) (Writer of literature for children with a left wing and feministic political message, and political advocate for less secrecy toward children about sex)

The Gerhardsen family
All members of the family are associated with the Norwegian Labour Party
Einar Gerhardsen (1945–51, 1955–63 and 1963–65 Prime Minister)
Rune Gerhardsen (son of Einar Gerhardsen) (1991–96 Leader of the city government in Oslo)
Tove Strand (divorced from Rune Gerhardsen and mother of Mina Gerhardsen) (1986–89 Minister of Social Affairs 1990–92 Minister of Employment and Administration)
Mina Gerhardsen (daughter of Rune Gerhardsen and Tove Strand and granddaughter of Einar Gerhardsen) (2005–2013 Political advisor for Prime Minister Jens Stoltenberg)
Eirik Øwre Thorshaug (married to Mina Gerhardsen) (2007–present political advisor for Minister of Justice Knut Storberget)

The Harlem family
All members of the family are associated with the Norwegian Labour Party
Gudmund Harlem. Minister of Social Affairs 1955–61 and Minister of Defense, 1961–63 and 1963–65.
Gro Harlem Brundtland. Daughter of Gudmund Harlem. Minister of Environmental Affairs 1974–79. Prime Minister three times: February 1981 – October 1981, 1986–89, and 1990–96. Director-General of the World Health Organization, 1998–2003.
Hanne Harlem. Daughter of Gudmund Harlem, sister of Gro Harlem Brundtland. Minister of Justice 2000–2001.

The Bondevik family
All members of the family is associated with the Norwegian Christian Democratic Party
Kjell Bondevik (1963 Minister of Social Affairs, 1965–71 Minister of Education and Church Affairs)
Kjell Magne Bondevik (nephew of Kjell Bondevik) (1997–2000 and 2000–05 Prime Minister, 1989–1990 Minister of Foreign Affairs, 1983–86 Minister of Education and Church Affairs)

Pakistan
Bhutto family
Zulfiqar Ali Bhutto, Civil Administrator, Prime Minister 1971-1977. 
Benazir Bhutto, 11th Prime Minister 1988–1990, 13th Prime Minister 1993-1996, Leader of the Opposition, Chairman of the Pakistan Peoples Party. 
Bilawal Bhutto, Minister of Foreign Affairs, Chairman of Pakistan People's Party, Chairperson of the National Assembly Standing Committee for Human Rights.

Sharif family
Nawaz Sharif, Quaid of Pakistan, Muslim League Leader (Nawaz), Prime Minister 1990–1993, again Prime Minister 1996–1999, third term 2013-2017.
Mian Muhammad Shehbaz Sharif, Chief minister Punjab 1996–199, again chief minister 2008–2013, again chief minister 2013–2018, Opposition leader in National Assembly 2018-2022, Prime Minister of Pakistan 2022-present.

Maryam Nawaz, Vice President of Muslim League (Nawaz), Chairperson of Prime Minister's Youth Programme.
Hamza Shahbaz Sharif Opposition leader in Punjab, Vice President of Muslim League (Nawaz), Member of Provincial Assembly of Punjab, Member of the National Assembly of Pakistan.

Palau
The Nakamura family (Brothers-sons)
Kuniwo Nakamura (President, Vice President)
Aric Nakamura (Senator (2017-2021))
Daiziro Nakamura (Senator)
Mamoru Nakamura (Chief Justice)
Toshiwo Nakamura (Legislator)

The Remengesau family (father-son)
Thomas Remengesau, Sr. (President, 1988–89 & 1985, Vice President, 1986–88)
Tommy Remengesau (President, 2013–2021 & 2001–09, Vice President 1993–2001, Senator 1989–93 & 2009–13)
TJ Imrur Remengesau (Senator 2021–Present)

The Tmetuchl-Toriboing family
Roman Tmetuchl (Presidential candidate 1980, 1984 & 1988, Governor of Airai State 1981-1990), Senator of First Congress of Micronesia for the TTPI 1971 - 1979), member of Council of Chiefs as Ngiraked of Tmeleu Clan of Airai State 1979-1999) 
Mlib Tmetuchl (son, Vice Presidential Candidate (2016) Senator 2009-2017)
Johnson Toribiong (nephew, President, 2009–2013, member of Council of Chiefs as Ngiraked of Tmeleu Clan of Airai State 1999-2008)
Joel Toribiong (nephew, Senator 2009–2017)
Lucius (Lakius) Malsol (nephew, Senator 2003-2005 & 1997-2001)

The Whipps family (father-son)
Surangel S. Whipps (Presidential candidate (2008), President of the Senate (2001–2009), former Speaker of the House of Delegates (1985–2001), member of Council of Chiefs as Rekemesik of Inglai Clan of Ngatpang State (1997–present))
Surangel S. Whipps, Jr. (son, President 2021–present, Presidential Candidate 2016, Governor of Ngatpang State, Senator (2009–2017), Honorary Consul of South Korea to Palau (2000-2021))
Mason Ngirchechebangel Whipps (son, Senator (2013–present), Speaker of the Airai State Legislature (2008–12), Governor of Ngatpang State)
Eric Ksau Whipps (son, Philippine Honorary Consul to Palau (2013–present))

Panama
The Arias family
Arnulfo Arias Madrid (President of Panama, 1940–41, 1949–51, and 1968)
Mireya Moscoso (wife of Arnulfo Arias Madrid; President of Panama, 1999–2004)
Harmodio Arias Madrid (brother of Arnulfo Arias Madrid; President of Panama, 1932–36)

The Arosemena family (brothers-in-law)
Juan Demóstenes Arosemena (President of Panama, 1936–39)
Alcibíades Arosemena (President of Panama, 1951–52)

The Boyd family (father-son)
Federico Boyd (President of Panama, 1910)
Augusto Samuel Boyd (President of Panama, 1939–40)

The Chiari-Robles family
Rodolfo Chiari (President of Panama, 1924–28)
Roberto Francisco Chiari Remón (son of Rodolfo Chiari; President of Panama, 1960–64)
Marco Aurelio Robles (nephew of Rodolfo Chiari; President of Panama, 1964–68)

The Delvalle family (uncle-nephew)
Max Delvalle (Vice President, 1964-48)
Eric Arturo Delvalle (President of Panama, 1985–88)

The Lewis family (father-son)
Gabriel Lewis Galindo (Foreign Minister, 1994–96)
Samuel Lewis Navarro (Foreign Minister, 2004–09)

The Torrijos family (father-son)
Omar Torrijos (Panamanian leader, 1968–81)
Martín Torrijos (President of Panama, 2004–09)

Papua New Guinea
The Chan family (father-son)

 Sir Julius Chan, Prime Minister of Papua New Guinea, 1980–1982 and 1994–97
 Byron Chan, member of the National Parliament, 2002–present

The Somare family (father-son)

 Sir Michael Somare, Prime Minister of Papua New Guinea, 1975–80, 1982–85 and 2002–present
 Arthur Somare, member of the National Parliament, 1997–present

Paraguay
The Argaña family
Luis María Argaña (Vice President, 1998–99)
Félix Argaña (son of Luis María Argaña; vice presidential candidate)
Nelson Argaña (son of Luis María Argaña; cabinet minister)

The Cubas family
Raúl Cubas Grau (President of Paraguay, 1998–99)
Carlos Cubas Grau (brother of Raúl Cubas Grau; cabinet minister)

The López family
Carlos Antonio López (President of Paraguay, 1844–62)
Francisco Solano López (son of Carlos Antonio López; President of Paraguay, 1862–69)

Peru
The Acuña family
 Virgilio Acuña Peralta, Congressman (2011–16)
 Humberto Acuña Peralta, Governor of Lambayeque (2010–18)
 César Acuña Peralta, Congressman (2000–06), Mayor of Trujillo (2007–14) and Governor of La Libertad (2015)
 Carmen Rosa Núñez Campos, Congresswoman (2014–16), former wife of César Acuña
 Richard Acuña Núñez, Congressman (2011–16), son of César Acuña and Carmen Rosa Núñez.

The Andrade family
 Alberto Andrade, Mayor of Miraflores (1990–96), Mayor of Lima (1996–2002) and Congressman (2006–09)
 Fernando Andrade, Mayor of Miraflores (1996–99 and 2003–06) and Congressman (2011–16)

The Bedoya family
 Luis Bedoya Reyes, Minister of Justice (1963), Mayor of Lima (1964–1969) and Member of the Constitutional Assembly (1978–79).
 Luis Bedoya de Vivanco (Mayor of Miraflores (1984–89 and 1999–2011) and Constituent Congressman (1992–1995)), son of Luis Bedoya Reyes
 Javier Bedoya de Vivanco (Deputy (1985–92) and Congressman (2006–16)), son of Luis Bedoya Reyes
 Javier Bedoya Denegri (Vice-Mayor of San Isidro (2015–2018)), son of Javier Bedoya de Vivanco and grandson of Luis Bedoya Reyes

The Belaúnde/Diez Canseco family
 Pedro Diez Canseco (President of Peru, 1863, 1865, and 1868)
 Víctor Andrés Belaúnde y Diez Canseco (Foreign Minister 1958; Pres. of the United Nations General Assembly, 1959), grandson of Pres. Pedro Diez Canseco
 Rafael Belaúnde y Diez Canseco (Pres. of the Council of Ministers, 1945–46), grandson of Pres. Pedro Diez Canseco
 Fernando Belaúnde Terry (President of Peru, 1963–68 and 1980–85), son of Rafael Belaúnde y Diez Canseco, nephew of Victor Andrés Belaunde y Diez Canseco
 José Antonio García Belaúnde (Foreign Minister, 2006–2011), nephew of Pres. Fernando Beláunde Terry
 Víctor Andrés García Belaúnde (Deputy, 1980–92, and Congressman, 2006–16), nephew of Pres. Fernando Belaúnde Terry
 Francisco Diez Canseco (President of Peru, 1872), brother of Pres. Pedro Diez Canseco
 Manuel Yrigoyen Diez Canseco (Mayor of Lima 1919–20), grandnephew of Pres. Pedro Diez Canseco and Pres. Francisco Diez Canseco
 Raul Diez Canseco Terry (First Vice President of Peru; resigned in 2004), great-great-grandnephew of Pres. Pedro Diez Canseco and Pres. Francisco Diez Canseco, first cousins twice removed of Manuel Yrigoyen Diez Canseco
 Javier Diez Canseco (former congressman), great-great-grandnephew of Pres. Pedro Diez Canseco and Pres. Francisco Diez Canseco, first cousins twice removed of Manuel Yrigoyen Diez Canseco, first cousin of Raul Diez Canseco Terry

The Castañeda family
 Carlos Castañeda Iparraguirre, Mayor of Chiclayo
 Luis Castañeda Lossio, (Mayor of Lima 2003–10 and 2015–18), son of Carlos Castañeda

The de la Riva-Agüero family
 José de la Riva Agüero (President of Peru, 1823)
 José de la Riva-Agüero y Looz Corswaren (Foreign Minister, 1972–1975, Pres. of the Council of Ministers, 1873–74 and Pres. of the Senate, 1878), son of José de la Riva-Agüero
 Enrique de la Riva-Agüero y Looz Corswaren (Pres. of the Council of Ministers, 1899–1900 and 1915–1917)
 José de la Riva-Agüero y Osma (Pres. of the Council of Ministers and Justice Minister, 1933–34)

The Fujimori family
 Alberto Fujimori (President of Peru, 1990–2000)
 Susana Higuchi (First Lady 1990–94, Congresswoman 1995–2006), former wife of President Alberto Fujimori
 Keiko Fujimori (First Lady 1994–2000, Congresswoman 2006–2011), daughter of President Alberto Fujimori and Susana Higuchi
 Kenji Fujimori (Congressman 2011–2016), son of President Alberto Fujimori and Susana Higuchi
 Santiago Fujimori (Congressman 2006–11), brother of President Alberto Fujimori

The García family
 Carlos García Ronceros, Secretary General of the APRA
 Nytha Pérez of García, Founding member of the APRA
 Alan García Pérez, President of Peru (1985–90 and 2006–11), Pres. of Constitutional Assembly (1978–1980), Deputy-President (1980–85) and member of Congress (1990–92)

The Morales-Bermúdez family
 Remigio Morales Bermúdez (President of Peru, 1890–94)
 Francisco Morales Bermúdez (President of Peru, 1975–80), grandson of Pres. Remigio Morales Bermúdez

The Pardo family
 Manuel Pardo Ribadeneyra (Regent for King Fernando VII's, Cuzco, 1816–19)
 Felipe Pardo y Aliaga (Foreign Minister, 1855), son of Manuel Pardo Ribadeneyra
 Manuel Pardo y Lavalle, President of Peru, (1872–76), son of Felipe Pardo y Aliaga
 José Pardo y Barreda, President of Peru, (1904–08 and 1915–19), Foreign Minister, son of Pres. Manuel Pardo y Lavalle
 Juan Pardo Heeren (Finance Minister, 1963), son of Pres. Jose Pardo y Barreda
 José Antonio de Lavalle y Pardo (Foreign Minister, 1882–83), nephew of Pres. Manuel Pardo y Lavalle and grandson of Felipe Pardo y Aliaga
 Felipe de Osma y Pardo (Foreign Minister, 1891), nephew of Pres. Manuel Pardo y Lavalle and grandson of Felipe Pardo y Aliaga

The Prado family
 Mariano Ignacio Prado Ochoa (President of Peru, 1865, 1865–68 and 1876–79)
 Javier Prado y Ugarteche (Prime Minister of Peru, 1910; son of Mariano Ignacio Prado)
 Jorge Prado y Ugarteche (Prime Minister of Peru, 1933; son of Mariano Ignacio Prado)
 Manuel Prado y Ugarteche (President of Peru, 1939–45 and 1956–62; son of Mariano Ignacio Prado)

The Schreiber/Arias Schreiber/Arias Stella family
 Germán Schreiber Waddington, Prime Minister of Peru (1910, 1914–1915)
 Diómedes Arias Schreiber, Minister of Justice (1936, 1937–1939), Minister of the Interior (1939), nephew of Germán Schreiber Waddington
 Ricardo Rivera Schreiber, Minister of Foreign Affairs (1952–1954), Ambassador of Peru to Spain (1943), Italy, and the United Kingdom (1949–1952), nephew of Germán Schreiber Waddington
 Max Arias-Schreiber Pezet, Minister of Justice (1984), nephew of Diómedes Arias Schreiber and Ricardo Rivera Schreiber, and great-nephew of Germán Schreiber Waddington
 Javier Arias Stella, Minister of Health (1963–1965, 1967–1968), Minister of Foreign Affairs (1980–1983), President of the United Nations Security Council (1984, 1985), cousin of Diómedes Arias Schreiber and Ricardo Rivera Schreiber, and great-nephew of Germán Schreiber Waddington

The Townsend family
 Andrés Townsend Ezcurra, Deputy (1963–68 and 80–85), Member of the Constitutional Assembly (1978–79) and Senator (1985–90).
 Anel Townsend Diez Canseco (Congresswoman (1995–2006) and Minister of Woman's Affairs (2003)), daughter of Andrés Townsend

Philippines

Pitcairn Islands
The Christian family
 Fletcher Christian – founding "chief" (1789–93)
 Steve Christian – Mayor (1999–2004); 7th generation descendant of Fletcher Christian; brother of Brenda Christian.
 Brenda Christian – Mayor (2004); 7th generation descendant of Fletcher Christian; sister of Steve Christian.

Poland
Poland is probably the only country in the world where identical twins were head of the government (Prime Minister) and head of state (President) at the same time.

The Gierek family (father-son)
 Edward Gierek – First Secretary of the Polish United Workers' Party (ruling party) 1970–80
 Adam Gierek – Member of the European Parliament, former Senator

The Giertych family (father-son-grandson)
 Jędrzej Giertych – political leader before WW2
 Maciej Giertych – Member of the European Parliament, earlier deputy to Sejm
 Roman Giertych – Deputy Prime Minister (2006–07), former leader of League of Polish Families (coalition party) 2006–07

The Grabski brothers
 Stanisław Grabski – politician leader before and after WW2
 Władysław Grabski – nationalist politician before WW2, Prime Minister of Poland (1920 and 1923–1925)

The Kaczyński family (identical twins)

 Jarosław Kaczyński – Prime Minister of Poland 2006–07, leader of Law and Justice (ruling party)
 Lech Kaczyński – President of Poland 2005–10, former President of Warsaw (capital city)

The Morawiecki family (father-son)
 Kornel Morawiecki- Was the founder and leader of Fighting Solidarity 
 Mateusz Morawiecki- Prime Minister of Poland

The Wałęsa family (father-son)
 Lech Wałęsa – President of Poland 1990–95
 Jarosław Wałęsa – deputy to Sejm since 2005, former candidate for EP seat

The Wojciechowski family 
 Stanisław Wojciechowski – President of Poland 1922–26 (overthrown by the Piłsudski's coup)
 Zofia Wojciechowska-Grabska – artist

Portugal
The Carmona and Carmona Rodrigues family (granduncle-grandnephew)
Óscar Carmona – Head of State
António Carmona Rodrigues – Minister of the Public Works, Transportation, and Habitation (2003–04); Mayor of Lisbon (interim) (2004–05); Mayor of Lisbon (2005–07)

The Soares family (father-son)
Mário Soares – Prime Minister (1976–78; 1983–85)
João Soares – Mayor of Lisbon (1995–2001)

The Portas family (father-brothers)
Nuno Portas – Minister (1970s)
Paulo Portas – Minister of State and National Defense (2002–05); former President of Popular Party (1998–2005); Minister of State and Foreign Affairs (2011–2013); Deputy Prime-Minister (2013–2015)
Miguel Portas – European Parliament Member, elected by the Left Bloc (2004–12)

The Menezes family (father-son)
Luís Filipe Menezes – Mayor of Gaia (1997–2013)
Luís Menezes – Member of Parliament (2009–2014)

The Vieira da Silva family (father-daughter)
José António Vieira da Silva - Minister of Economy, Innovation and Development (2009-2011); Minister of Labour, Solidarity and Social Security (2005-2009, 2015-2019) 
Mariana Vieira da Silva - Minister of Presidency and Administrative Modernization (2018-2019);Minister of State and Presidency (2019-)

The Cabrita-Vitorino family (husband-wife)
Eduardo Cabrita - Deputy Minister (2015-2017); Minister of Internal Administration (2017-2019, 2019-)
Ana Paula Vitorino - Minister of Sea (2015-2019); Member of Parliament (2019-)

Puerto Rico
The Calderón family
Sila María Calderón Serra (Governor, 2001–05)
Sila María González Calderón, member of the Puerto Rican Senate

The Hernandez family
José Alfredo Hernández Mayoral (former governor candidate)
 Juan Eugenio Hernández Mayoral (member of Puerto Rico's Senate)
Rafael Hernández Colón (Governor, 1973–77, 1985–93)

The Muñoz family
Luis Muñoz Rivera (Resident Commissioner, 4 March 1911 – 15 November 1916)
Luis Muñoz Marín (Governor, 1948–64)
Victoria Muñoz Mendoza (former governor candidate)

The Rivera family
Ramón Luis Rivera Jr. (mayor of Bayamón)
Ramón Luis Rivera Sr. (former mayor of Bayamón)

The Pesquera family
Lic. Rafael A Pesquera Reguero (former municipal assembly member of Bayamón, former member of Puerto Rico's Senate)
Dr. Carlos Ignacio Pesquera Morales (former Secretary of Transportation And Public Works, former governor candidate)
Farrique Pesquera Morales (former Vice President of a Puerto Rican Independence Party municipal party committee)
Lic.José Lorenzo Pesquera (Resident Commissioner of Puerto Rico)
Santiago Mari Pesquera (a assassinated pro independence activist)
Paquita Pesquera Cantellops (activist, mother of Santiago Mari and founder of Puerto Rican Independence Party)
Carlos Pesquera (former Ombudsman)
Lic. José Feliú Pesquera (Founder of "Renovación Cristiana" Party)
Jorge Pesquera (former Secretary of Tourism)
Dr. Héctor Luis Pesquera Sevillano (Co-President of Hostosian National Independence Movement)
Hector Pesquera (Police Chief)

The Romero family
Melinda Romero Donnelly (ex member of Puerto Rico's Senate)
Carlos Romero Barceló (Governor)
The Roselló family
 Pedro Rosselló (Governor, 4 January 2005 – 2 January 2009)
 Ricky Rosselló (Governor, 2 January 2017 – 2 August 2019)

Romania 
The Brătianu family
 Dimitrie Brătianu (Prime Minister, 1881)
 Ion Brătianu (Prime Minister, 1876–81, 1881–88) (brother)
 Ionel Brătianu (Prime Minister, 1909–11, 1914–18, 1918–19, 1922–26, 1927) (son of Ion Brătianu)
 Gheorghe I. Brătianu (Leader of the National Liberal Party-Brătianu, 1930–1938) (son of Ionel Brătianu)
 Vintilă Brătianu (Prime Minister 1927–28) (son of Ion Brătianu)
 Dinu Brătianu (Finance Minister, 1933–34) (son of Ion Brătianu)

The Băsescu family (father, daughter, brother)
 Traian Băsescu (President, 2004–2014)
 Elena Băsescu (member of European Parliament, 2009–2014), daughter of Traian, elected by her father's party while he was President
 Mircea Băsescu, brother of Traian, in jail for corruption (extorsion of money from a mobster chief for promises of justice abuse by his brother's power)

The Ponta-Sârbu family (husband, wife, father-in-law)
 Victor Ponta (Prime Minister, 2012–2015)
 Daciana Sârbu (Member of European Parliament)
 Ilie Sârbu (Senator, President of the Senate, Minister of Agriculture)

Russia / Soviet Union 
The Artyukhov family
 Andrey Artyukhov (b. 1958) Senator from Tyumen Oblast (2002–05), Member of the Tyumen Oblast Duma (since 2007)
 Dmitry Artyukhov (b. 1988) Governor of Yamalo-Nenets Autonomous Okrug, son of Andrey Artyukhov

The Brezhnev-Churbanov family
 Leonid Brezhnev (1906–82) Leader of the Soviet Union (1964–82)
 Yuri Brezhnev (1933–2013) First Deputy Minister of Foreign Trade of the USSR, son of Leonid Brezhnev
 Andrey Brezhnev (1961–2018) First Secretary of the Communist Party of Social Justice (2014–16), son of Yuri Brezhnev
 Yuri Churbanov (1936–2013) Deputy of Ministers of Interior of the USSR, son-in-law of Leonid Brezhnev

The Budyonny-Peskov family
 Semyon Budyonny
 Dmitry Peskov, granddaughter's husband

The Glazyev-Sinelin-Vityazeva family (brothers-in-law, alumni, co-partisans)
 Sergei Glazyev
 Mikhail Sinelin, Head of the Secretariat of the Chairman of the Government of the Russian Federation
 Yuliya Glazyeva-Sinelina, prime Russian sociology of religion guru (1972–2013)
 Yuliya Lozanova-Vityazeva, Ukrainian-Russian propagandist (1981-)
 Oxana Gomzik-Glazyeva, Russian politician (1972-)

The Gorbachev family
 Mikhail Gorbachev (b. 1931-2022) (Communist Party General Secretary, Chairman of the Presidium of the Supreme Soviet, Chairman of the Supreme Soviet, and President of the Soviet Union)
 Raisa Gorbacheva (1932–99) (First Lady of the Soviet Union who took on a large political and public role, unlike her virtually invisible predecessors), wife of Mikhail Gorbachev

The Kadyrov family
 Akhmad Kadyrov (1951–2004) 1st President of the Chechen Republic (2003–2004)
 Ramzan Kadyrov (b. 1976) 3rd Head of the Chechen Republic (since 2007), son of Akhmad Kadyrov

The Khristenko-Golikova family
 Viktor Khristenko (b. 1957) Minister of Industry and Trade of Russian Federation, husband of Tatyana Golikova
 Tatyana Golikova (b. 1966) Minister of Health and Social Development of Russian Federation, wife of Viktor Khristenko

The Kokov family
 Valery Kokov (1941–2005) 1st President of Kabardino-Balkaria (1992–2005)
 Kazbek Kokov (b. 1973) Acting Head of Kabardino-Balkaria since 2018, son of Valery Kokov

The Kondratenko family
 Nikolai Kondratenko (1940–2013) Governor of Krasnodar Krai (1997–2001)
 Alexey Kondratenko (b. 1969) Senator from Krasnodar Krai (since 2015), Member of the Legislative Assembly of Krasnodar Krai (2007–2015), son of Nikolai Kondratenko

The Kosygin-Primakov family (somebodies-in-law via two marriages)
 Alexei Kosygin (1904–80) (Premier of the Soviet Union)
 Germen Gvishiani (1928–2003) (Professor), son of a former NKVD Lieutenant General, son-in-law of Alexei Kosygin
 Yevgeny Primakov (1929–2015) (Foreign Minister in 1996–98 and Prime Minister of Russia in 1998–99), brother-in-law of Germen Gvishiani
 Yevgeny Primakov Jr. (b. 1976) (Member of the State Duma since 2018), grandson of Yevgeny Primakov

The Lebed family
 Alexander Lebed (1950–2002) 1996 Russian presidential candidate, Secretary of the Security Council (1996), Governor of Krasnoyarsk Krai (1998–2002), brother of Aleksey Lebed
 Aleksey Lebed (b. 1955) Head of Khakassia (1997–2009), brother of Alexander Lebed

The Magomedov family
 Magomedali Magomedov (b. 1930) 1st President of Dagestan (1994–2006)
 Magomedsalam Magomedov (b. 1964) 3rd Head of Dagestan (2010–2013), son of Magomedali Magomedov

The Patrushev family
 Nikolai Patrushev (b. 1951) Secretary of the Security Council of Russia (since 2008), Director of the Federal Security Service (1999–2008)
 Dmitry Patrushev (b. 1977) Minister of Agriculture (since 2018), son of Nikolai Patrushev

The Sobchak-Narusova family
 Anatoly Sobchak (1937–2000) (mayor of Saint Petersburg)
 Lyudmila Narusova (b. 1951) (senator and MP), widow of Anatoly Sobchak
 Ksenia Sobchak (b. 1981), 2018 Russian presidential candidate, daughter of Anatoly Sobchak and Lyudmila Narusova

The Shoygu family 
 Kuzhuget Shoygu (1921–2010) First Deputy Prime Minister of Tuvan ASSR
 Sergey Shoygu (b. 1955) Russian Minister of Defense (since 2012), Governor of Moscow Oblast (2012) and Minister of Emergency Situations, son of Kuzhuget Shoygu
 Yulia Shoygu (b. 1977) Director of Center of Emergency Psychological Aid of EMERCOM of Russia (since 2002), daughter of Sergey Shoygu
 Larisa Shoygu (1953–2021) Member of the State Duma between 2007 and 2021, daughter of Kuzhuget Shoygu

The Stalin-Zhdanov family (fathers of spouses)
 Joseph Stalin (1878–1953) (Soviet leader)
 Andrey Zhdanov (1896–1948) (member of the Politburo of the Central Committee of the Communist Party of the Soviet Union)
 Svetlana Alliluyeva (b. 1926), daughter of Joseph Stalin, daughter-in-law of Andrey Zhdanov

The Tkachov family
 Alexey Tkachov (b. 1957) Member of the State Duma (since 2003), brother of Alexander Tkachov
 Alexander Tkachov (b. 1960) Minister of Agriculture (2015–18), Governor of Krasnodar Krai (2001–15), brother of Alexey Tkachov
 Roman Batalov (b. 1985) Member of the Legislative Assembly of Krasnodar Krai (2007–2017), son-in-law of Alexander Tkachov

The Trotsky-Kamenev family (brothers-in-law)
 Leon Trotsky (1879–1940) (People's Commissar for Foreign Affairs, People's Commissar for Army and Navy Affairs)
 Lev Kamenev (1883–1936) (Chairman of the Central Executive Committee of the All-Russian Congress of Soviets), brother-in-law of Trotsky

The Udaltsov family
 Ivan Udaltsov (1918–95) Soviet Ambassador to Greece (1976–79)
 Alexander Udaltsov (b. 1951) Russian Ambassador to Lithuania (since 2013), Slovakia (2005–10) and Latvia (1996–2001), son of Ivan Udaltsov
 Sergey Udaltsov (b. 1977) leader of Left Front, grandson of Ivan Udaltsov and nephew of Alexander Udaltsov

The Vorobyov family
 Yury Vorobyov (b. 1948) Senator from Vologda Oblast (since 2007)
 Andrey Vorobyov (b. 1970) Governor of Moscow Oblast (since 2012), son of Yury Vorobyov

The Yeltsin family (father-in-law and son-in-law)
 Boris Yeltsin, President of Russia (1991–99)
 Tatyana Yeltsin-Yumasheva (b. 1960), daughter of Boris Yeltsin
 Valentin Yumashev (b. 1957), chief of the Presidential administration of Russia, husband of Tatyana
 Oleg Deripaska (b. 1968) (one of the richest Russian citizens), son-in-law of Valentin Yumashev (by the former marriage)

The Zhirinovsky-Lebedev family
 Vladimir Zhirinovsky (b. 1946) Leader of the Liberal Democratic Party of Russia (since 1992), Member of the State Duma since 1993, 6 times Russian presidential candidate
 Igor Lebedev (b. 1972) Member of the State Duma since 1999, son of Vladimir Zhirinovsky

The Zubkov-Serdyukov family (father-in-law and son-in-law)
 Viktor Zubkov (b. 1941) (Prime Minister of Russia September 2007 – May 2008)
 Anatoliy Serdyukov (b. 1962) (Defence Minister of the Russian Federation from February 2007), son-in-law of Viktor Zubkov
Zhukov daughter and vasilevski son spouses
Lebed brothers

The Zyuganov family
 Gennady Zyuganov (b. 1944) Leader of the Communist Party of the Russian Federation (since 1993), Member of the State Duma since 1993, four times Russian presidential candidate
 Leonid Zyuganov (b. 1988) Member of the Moscow City Duma since 2014, grandson of Gennady Zyuganov

Rwanda
The Habyarimana family and Kayibanda family
Grégoire Kayibanda (former President)
Juvénal Habyarimana (Godfather of Kayibanda's son; former President)
Agathe Habyarimana (wife of Juvénal Habyarimana and partner-in-power)

Saint Lucia
The Cenac family (brother)
Winston Cenac (Prime Minister of Saint Lucia, 1981–82)
Neville Cenac (Foreign Minister, 1987–92)

The Lewis family (father-son)
Sir Allen Lewis (Governor-General of Saint Lucia, 1979–80 and 1982–87)
Vaughan Lewis (Prime Minister of Saint Lucia, 1996–97)

Samoa
The Mataʻafa family
Fiamē Mataʻafa Faumuina Mulinuʻu II (Prime Minister)
Fiamē Naomi Mataʻafa (daughter; Prime Minister)

São Tomé and Príncipe
The Costa Alegre family
Norberto Costa Alegre (Prime Minister, 1992–94)
Alda Bandeira (wife of Norberto Costa Alegre; Foreign Minister, 1991–93 and 2002)

The Trovoada family (father-son)
Miguel Trovoada (President, 1991–2001)
Patrice Trovoada (Prime Minister, 2008 and 2010–present)

Senegal
The Wade family (father-son)
Abdoulaye Wade (President of Senegal, 2000–12)
Karim Wade (Energy minister)

Seychelles
The Ferrari family
Maxime Ferrari (opposition leader)
Jean-François Ferrari (son of Maxime Ferrari; Seychelles National Party activist)
Pauline Ferrari (daughter of Maxime Ferrari)

Sierra Leone
The Margai brothers
Milton Margai (Prime Minister, 1961–64)
Albert Margai (Prime Minister, 1964–67)

Singapore
The Lee family (Singapore)
Lee Kuan Yew (Prime Minister of Singapore, 1959–1990)
Lee Hsien Loong (son of Lee Kuan Yew; Prime Minister of Singapore, 2004– )

Slovenia 
The Kardelj-Maček family

 Edvard Kardelj (1910–1979) Member of Presidency of Yugoslavia (1974–1979), President of the Federal Assembly of Yugoslavia (1963–1967), Deputy Prime Minister of Yugoslavia (1946–1963), Minister of Foreign Affairs of Yugoslavia (1948–1953)
 Igor Šoltes (1964–, grandson of Edvard Kardelj) President of the Court of Auditors (2004–2013), Member of the European Parliament (2014–2019)
 Pepca Kardelj (1914–1990, wife of Edvard Kardelj) 
 Ivan Maček – Matija (1908–1993, brother Pepca Kardelj, brother-in-law of Edvard Kardelj) President of the People's Assembly of SR Slovenia (1963–1967), Deputy Prime Minister and Minister of Interior of SR Slovenia (1945–1953), Member of Federal Yugoslav Government (1953–1963)

The Oman-Podobnik family

 Ivan Oman (1929–2019) Member of the Presidency of Slovenia (1990–1992), Member of the National Assembly of Slovenia (1992–1996)
 Marjan Podobnik (1960–, son-in-law of Ivan Oman) Deputy Prime Minister of Slovenia (1996–2000), Member of the National Assembly of Slovenia (1990–1996)
 Janez Podobnik (1959–, brother of Marjan Podobnik) Speaker of the National Assembly (1996–2000), Minister of Environment and Spatial Planning (2004–2008), Member of the National Assembly (1992–2000), Mayor of idrija (1990–1994), Mayor of Cerkno (1994–1998)

Solomon Islands
The Chan family (father–son)
Tommy Chan (Member of Parliament and businessman)
Laurie Chan  Foreign Minister, 2002–2006)

The Kemakeza family (siblings)
Sir Allan Kemakeza (Prime Minister of the Solomon Islands, 2001–2006, Member of Parliament 1989–2010)
Ataban Tonezepo (brother of Sir Allan Kemakeza; Premier of Central province)

The Kenilorea family (father–son)
Peter Kenilorea, Prime Minister of the Solomon Islands (1978–1981, 1984–1986)
Peter Kenilorea Jr. (son), Member of Parliament (since 2019)

Somalia
Barre family (brothers)
 Muhammad Siad Barre (President, 1969–91)
 Abdirahman Jama Barre (Foreign Minister, 1977–87)

Sharmarke family (father-son)
 Abdirashid Ali Shermarke (President, 1967–69)
 Omar Abdirashid Ali Sharmarke (Prime Minister, 2009–10)

South Africa
The De Klerk family
Johannes de Klerk (Minister of Home Affairs 1961–1966)
Frederik Willem de Klerk (State President 1989–1994)
 
The Mandela family and Machel family
Nelson Mandela – President (1994–99)
Winnie Madikizela-Mandela – political activist; 2nd wife of Nelson Mandela
Graça Machel – First Lady of Mozambique (1975–83) and South Africa (1998–99); widow of Samora Machel; 3rd wife of Nelson Mandela
Samora Machel – President of Mozambique (1975–83); first husband of Graça Machel

The Marte family
 Otto-Carl Marte
 Laura-Marie Marte
 Eric Marte
 Matthew Marte

The Matthews family and the Pandor family
 ZK Matthews, political activist and educator in South Africa, Motswana ambassador to the United States
 Joe Matthews, political activist and politician in South Africa, Motswana deputy attorney-general 
 Naledi Pandor, South African political activist and politician, minister of international relations and cooperation, chairperson of the National Council of Provinces

The Mbeki family
Govan Mbeki
 Epainette Mbeki (mother)
Thabo Mbeki (son)
 Moeletsi Mbeki (son)

The Ngcuka family (husband-wife)
Bulelani Ngcuka
Phumzile Mlambo-Ngcuka

The Sisulu family
 Walter Sisulu
 Albertina Sisulu
 Zwelakhe Sisulu (son)
 Lindiwe Sisulu (daughter)
 Max Sisulu (son)
 Elinor Sisulu (daughter-in-law)

The Slovo family and First families (husband-wife)
Joe Slovo – Communist leader
Ruth First

The Tambo family
 Oliver Tambo
 Adelaide Tambo
 Dali Tambo

The Zuma family (ex-spouses)
Jacob Zuma, President of South Africa (2009–2018)
Nkosazana Dlamini-Zuma, former Foreign Minister of South Africa

Spain
The Aznar family
Manuel Aznar Zubigaray (Echalar, Navarra, 1894 – Madrid, 1975) Basque nationalist journalist, joined the Nationalist military revolt during the Spanish Civil War and joined Falange Española, father of:
Manuel (Imanol) Aznar Acedo (1916–2001), Falangist journalist, father of:
José María Aznar, fourth Prime Minister of Spain from 1996 to 2004 relative of:
Ana Botella (wife) mayor of Madrid from 2011 to 2015

The Primo de Rivera family – is a Spanish military family prominent in politics of the 19th and 20th centuries:
Joaquín Primo de Rivera y Pérez de Acal (1734–†1800), serviceman and Spanish Colonial Governor of Maracaibo (Venezuela), father of:
Joaquín Primo de Rivera y Ortiz de Pinedo (1786–†1819), Spanish Colonel, fought in the Peninsular War against the French and in the Spanish American wars of independence against the Army of the Andes in Chile;
José Primo de Rivera y Ortiz de Pinedo (1777–†1853), Serviceman and Congressmen, father of:
Fernando Primo de Rivera y Sobremonte (1831–†1921), Serviceman and Politician;
Miguel Primo de Rivera y Sobremonte (1826–†1898), Serviceman, father of:
Fernando Primo de Rivera y Orbaneja (1879–†1921), Serviceman;
Miguel Primo de Rivera y Orbaneja (1870–†1930), Serviceman, Politician and Dictator of Spain. Father of:
José Antonio Primo de Rivera y Sáenz de Heredia (1903–†1936), polítician during the Spanish Second Republic, founded the fascist Falange Española party;
Pilar Primo de Rivera y Sáenz de Heredia (1907–†1991), Leader of the women's section of the Falange Española;
Miguel Primo de Rivera y Sáenz de Heredia (1904–†1964), Minister during the regime of Francisco Franco;
Fernando Primo de Rivera y Sáenz de Heredia (1908–†1936), father of:
Miguel Primo de Rivera y Urquijo (1934–†2018), Mayor of Jerez de la Frontera (1965–71) during the regime of Francisco Franco

The Suarez family
Adolfo Suarez, first Prime minister of Spain (1975–81)
Adolfo Suarez Yllana, Politician

Sri Lanka

Syria
The Assad family
Hafez al-Assad (President of Syria, 1971–2000)
Bashar al-Assad (son of Hafez al-Assad; President of Syria, 2000– )
Basil al-Assad (son of Hafez al-Assad)
Rifaat al-Assad (brother of Hafez al-Assad)
The Atassi family
Hashim al-Atassi
Nureddin al-Atassi
The al-Azm family
Khalid al-Azm
Haqqi al-Azm

Sweden
House of Bernadotte

Folke Bernadotte  diplomat and politician and he is noted for his negotiation for the release of prisoners from the German concentration camps in World War II, grandson of King Oscar II and nephew of King Gustaf V.

Bildt family
Gillis Bildt (1820–94), Swedish independent Conservative politician, Prime Minister of Sweden 1888–89.
Knut Gillis Bildt, Swedish Army general, member of parliament for eight years.
Carl Bildt, leader of the Swedish Liberal Conservative Moderate Party 1986–99, Prime Minister of Sweden 1991–94, European Union Special Envoy to Former Yugoslavia 1995 and Minister for Foreign Affairs 2006–14, former son-in-law of Gösta Bohman, great-great-grandson of Gillis Bildt.
Anna Maria Corazza Bildt, Italian-Swedish Liberal Conservative Moderate Party politician, Member of the European Parliament since 2009, wife of Carl Bildt

Bodström family
Lennart Bodström, social democratic Minister for Foreign Affairs 1982–85 and Minister for Education 1985–89.
Thomas Bodström, social democratic Minister for Justice 2000–06, son of Lennart Bodström

Bohman family
Gösta Bohman, leader of the Swedish Liberal Conservative Moderate Party from 1970 to 1981, Minister for the Economy 1976–78 and 1979–81
Mia Bohman, Swedish Liberal Conservative Moderate Party politician, former wife of Carl Bildt, daughter of Gösta Bohman

Cederschiöld family
Carl Cederschiöld, Conservative Mayor of Stockholm 1991–94 and 1998–2002
Charlotte Cederschiöld, Conservative Member of Parliament 1988–95 and Member of the European Parliament 1995–2009, married to Carl Cederschiöld
Sebastian Cederschiöld, Conservative Member of Parliament 2006, son of Charlotte and Carl Cederschiöld

De Geer family
Louis De Geer the elder (1818–96), Justice Prime Minister 1858–70, Prime Minister of Sweden 1876–80
Louis De Geer the younger (1854–1935), Prime Minister of Sweden 1920–1921, son of Louis De Geer the elder
Gerard De Geer (1858–1943), Member of Parliament 1900–05, son of Louis De Geer the older
Gerard De Geer (1889–1980), liberal Member of Parliament 1937–43 and 1951–58, grandson of a brother to Louis De Geer the elder
Lars De Geer (1922–2002), liberal Minister of Defence 1978–79, son of Gerard De Geer (1889–1980)

Douglas family
Gustaf Douglas, member of the board of Swedish Liberal Conservative Moderate Party 2002–14. 
Walburga Habsburg Douglas, Swedish Liberal Conservative Moderate Party Member of Parliament 2006–14.

Hammarskjöld family
Hjalmar Hammarskjöld, Prime Minister of Sweden 1914–17
Dag Hammarskjöld, cabinet minister without portfolio 1951–53, UN Secretary General 1953–61, son of Hjalmar Hammarskjöld

Heckscher family
Gunnar Heckscher, Conservative Party leader 1961–65
Sten Heckscher, social democratic Minister of Industry and Employment 1994–96, son of Gunnar Heckscher

Leijon family
Anna-Greta Leijon, Social Democratic cabinet minister 1973–76 and 1982–88
Britta Lejon, Social Democratic cabinet minister 1998–2002, Member of Parliament 2002–06, daughter of Anna-Greta Leijon

Myrdal family
Gunnar Myrdal, Social Democratic cabinet minister 1945–47
Alva Myrdal, Social Democratic cabinet minister 1966–73, wife of Gunnar Myrdal
Jan Myrdal, author and independent communist political writer and columnist, son of Alva and Gunnar Myrdal

Ohlin family
Bertil Ohlin, party leader of the liberal Folkpartiet 1944–67, minister of commerce in the wartime government 1944–45.
Anne Wibble, representing the same party, Minister of Finance in 1991–94, daughter of Bertil Ohlin.

Reinfeldt family
Fredrik Reinfeldt, leader of the Swedish Liberal Conservative Moderate Party since 2003, Prime Minister of Sweden 2006-2014.
Filippa Reinfeldt, Swedish Liberal Conservative Moderate Party politician, former Mayor of Täby, and since 2006 Health Service Commissioner of the Stockholm County, former wife of Fredrik Reinfeldt (1992–2012)

Wallenberg family

Knut Wallenberg (1853–1938), banker, Swedish Minister for Foreign Affairs 1914–17
Raoul Wallenberg (1912–47?) businessman and diplomat, he helped many Hungarian Jews during the later stages of World War II, by issuing temporary Swedish "protective passports", grandnephew of Knut Wallenberg.

Thailand
Charnvirakul family
 Chavarat Charnvirakul, Deputy Prime Minister, Minister of Interior
 Anutin Charnvirakul (son), Deputy Prime Minister, Minister of Health

Juangroongruangkit family
 Suriya Juangroongruangkit, Deputy Prime Minister
 Thanathorn Juangroongruangkit (nephew), Leader of Future Forward Party

Shinawatra family
 Thaksin Shinawatra, former Prime Minister of Thailand (2001–2006), since he was overthrown in 2006, he has lived in exile. Brother to Yingluck Shinawatra.
 Panthongtae Shinawatra, Thai politician and businessman. Son to Thaksin Shinawatra.
 Yingluck Shinawatra, former Prime Minister of Thailand (2011–2014), leader of Pheu Thai Party. Sister to Thaksin Shinawatra
 Somchai Wongsawat, Thai politician, former Prime Minister of Thailand (2008). Brother-in-law to Thaksin and Yingluck Shinawatra.

Silpa-archa family
 Banharn Silpa-archa, Prime Minister
 Varawut Silpa-archa (son), Minister of Natural Resources and Environment 

Vejjajiva family
 Long Vejjajiva, Minister for Health Affairs (1959–1969)
 Athasit Vejjajiva, Deputy Minister for Health Affairs (1991–1992)
 Abhisit Vejjajiva, Leader of Democrat Party (Thailand), Prime Minister of Thailand (2008–2011)
 Suranand Vejjajiva (cousin of Abhisit), former exco member for Thai Rak Thai, former Member of Parliament
 Nitsai Vejjajiva, former Thai ambassador to Malaysia

Togo
The Gnassingbé family
Gnassingbé Eyadema (President of Togo, 1967–2005)
Fauré Gnassingbé (son of Gnassingbé Eyadema; President of Togo, 2005–)
Kpatcha Gnassingbé (son of Gnassingbé Eyadema; minister of defence)

The Olympio family
Sylvanus Olympio (President of Togo, 1960–63)
Gilchrist Olympio (son of Sylvanus Olympio; leader, Union of Forces for Change)
Harry Olympio (distant cousin of Gilchrist Olympio; opposition party leader)

Trinidad and Tobago
The Capildeo family
Simbhoonath Capildeo (1914–90)
Rudranath Capildeo (1920–70)
Surendranath Capildeo
The Fitzpatrick family
George F. Fitzpatrick (1875–1920)
Hon. George Fitzpatrick II
The Sinanan family
Ashford Sastri Sinanan (1923–1994)
Mitra Sinanan 
The Panday family
Basdeo Panday (1933–present)
Subhas Panday
Mickela Panday
The Maraj/Maharaj family
Bhadase Sagan Maraj
Satnarayan Maharaj

Tunisia
The Bourguiba family
Habib Bourguiba (President of Tunisia, 1957–87)
Habib Bourguiba, Jr. (son of Habib Bourguiba; Foreign Minister, 1964–70)

Turkey
The Ağaoğlu family

 Ahmet Ağaoğlu (1869–1939) (Member of Parliament, 1923–31)
 Tezer Taşkıran (1907–1979) (Member of Parliament, 1943–54)
 Samet Ağaoğlu (1909–1982) (Son of Ahmet Ağaoğlu, Deputy Prime Minister, 1950–52)
Neriman Ağaoğlu (1912–1984) (Wife of Samet Ağaoğlu, Member of Parliament, 1961–69)

The Ağar family (father-son)
 Mehmet Ağar (born 1951) (Minister of Justice, 1996; Minister of Interior, 1996)
 Tolga Ağar (born 1975) (Member of Parliament, 2018–present)
The Akçal family
 Yusuf İzzet Akçal (1906–1987) (Member of Parliament, 1950–60, 1977–80)
 Erol Yılmaz Akçal (1931–2016) (Son of Yusuf İzzet Akçal; Minister of Culture and Tourism, 1971–73)
 Mesut Yılmaz (1944–2020) (Nephew of Yusuf İzzet Akçal; Prime Minister, 1991, 1996, 1997–99)
The Albayrak family
Sadık Albayrak (born 1942) (Candidate for Parliament in 1977, 1991 and 1995 general elections)
 Berat Albayrak (born 1978) (Son of Sadık Albayrak, Son-in-law of Recep Tayyip Erdoğan; Minister of Finance and Treasury, 2018–20)
Recep Tayyip Erdoğan (born 1954) (Prime Minister, 2003–14; President, 2014–present)
The Arıburun family
 Naci Eldeniz (1875–1948) (Member of Parliament, 1927–46)
Perihan Arıburun (1913–2001) (Daughter of Naci Eldeniz; Member of Parliament, 1957–60)
Tekin Arıburun (1903–1993) (Husband of Perihan Arıburun; Chairman of the Senate, 1970–77; Acting President, 1973)
Hikmet Bayur (1891–1980) (Cousin of Perihan Arıburun; Minister of National Education, 1933–34)
The Arınç family (father-son)

 Bülent Arınç (born 1948) (Speaker of the Grand National Assembly, 2002–07)
 Ahmet Mücahit Arınç (born 1986) (Member of Parliament, 2018–present)

The Bayar family

 Celal Bayar (1883–1986) (Prime Minister, 1937–39; President, 1950–60)
Ahmet İhsan Gürsoy (1913–2008) (Son-in-law of Celal Bayar; Member of Parliament, 1946–60)
 Nilüfer Gürsoy (born 1921) (Daughter of Celal Bayar; Member of Parliament, 1965–69, 1973–80) 
The Bölükbaşı family (father-son)

 Osman Bölükbaşı (1913–2002) (Member of Parliament, 1950–73)
 Deniz Bölükbaşı (1949–2018) (Member of Parliament, 2007–11)
The Bucak family (uncle-nephew)

 Mehmet Celal Bucak (1936–1983) (Member of Parliament, 1973–80)
 Sedat Bucak (born 1960) (Member of Parliament, 1991–2002)

The Çiçek family (cousins)

 Cemil Çiçek (born 1946) (Speaker of the Grand National Assembly, 2011–2015)
 Mehmet Çiçek (born 1946) (Member of Parliament, 1999–2011)

The Demirtaş family (brothers)

 Nurettin Demirtaş (born 1972) (Leader of the Democratic Society Party, 2007–2008) 
 Selahattin Demirtaş (born 1973) (Candidate for presidency in 2014 and 2018)

The Ecevit family (spouses)
 Bülent Ecevit (1925–2006) (Prime Minister, 1974, 1977, 1978–79 and 1999–2002)
 Rahşan Ecevit (1923–2020) (Leader of the Democratic Leftist Party, 1985–87)
The Erbakan family (father-son)

 Necmettin Erbakan (1926–2011) (Prime Minister, 1996–97)
 Fatih Erbakan (born 1979) (Leader of the New Welfare Party, 2018–present)
The Feyzioğlu family (Grandfather-grandson)

 Turhan Feyzioğlu (1922–1988) (Acting Prime Minister, 1980)
 Metin Feyzioğlu (born 1969) (Ambassador of Turkey to the Northern Cyprus, 2022–present)

The Gaydalı family

 Selâhattin İnan (1887–1969) (Member of Parliament, 1950–60)
 Abidin İnan Gaydalı (1923–1990) (Son of Selâhattin İnan; Member of Parliament, 1969–80)
 Kâmran İnan (1929–2015) (Son of Selâhattin İnan; Minister of Energy and Natural Resources, 1977–78)
 Mahmut Celadet Gaydalı (born 1951) (Son of Abidin İnan Gaydalı; Member of Parliament, 2015–present)
 Edip Safder Gaydalı (born 1952) (Son of Abidin İnan Gaydalı; Minister of State, 1999–2002)

The Gülek family (father-daughter)

 Kasım Gülek (1905–1996) (Secretary General of the Republican People's Party, 1950–59)
 Tayyibe Gülek (born 1969) (Minister of State, 2002)

The İslam–Kavakçı family

 Nadir Latif İslam (born 1930) (Member of Parliament, 1973–77)
 Nazır Cihangir İslam (born 1959) (Son of Nadir Latif İslam; Member of Parliament, 2018–present)
 Merve Kavakçı (born 1968) (Former husband of Nazır Cihangir İslam; Member-elect of Parliament, 1999)
 Ravza Kavakçı Kan (born 1972) (Sister of Merve Kavakçı; Member of Parliament, 2015–present)
 Ayşenur İslam (born 1958) (Daughter-in-law of Nadir Latif İslam; Minister of Family and Social Policy, 2013–15)

The İnönü family 
 İsmet İnönü (1884–1973) (President, 1938–50; Prime Minister, 1923–24, 1925–37 and 1961–65)
Erdal İnönü (1926–2007) (Son of İsmet İnönü; Deputy Prime Minister, 1991–93; Acting Prime Minister, 1993)
Ayşe Gülsün Bilgehan (born 1957) (Granddaughter of İsmet İnönü; Member of Parliament, 2002–07, 2011–18) 
Hayri İnönü (born 1954) (Grandson of İsmet İnönü; Mayor of Şişli, 2014–19)
The Melen family (father-son)

 Ferit Melen (1906–1988) (Prime Minister, 1972–73)
 Mithat Melen (1947–2020) (Member of Parliament, 2007–11)

The Menderes family (father-sons)

 Adnan Menderes (1899–1961) (Prime Minister, 1950–60)
Yüksel Menderes (1930–1972) (Member of Parliament, 1965–72)
Mutlu Menderes (1937–1978) (Member of Parliament, 1973–78)
Aydın Menderes (1946–2011) (Member of Parliament, 1977–80, 1995–2002)
The Öcalan family (cousins)
Dilek Öcalan (born 1987) (Member of Parliament, 2015–2018)
Ömer Öcalan (born 1987) (Member of Parliament, 2018–present)
The Özal family

 Turgut Özal (1927–1993) (Prime Minister, 1983–89; President, 1989–93)
 Semra Özal (born 1934) (Wife of Turgut Özal; Head of the Provincial Organization of ANAP in Istanbul, 1991–92)
 Korkut Özal (1929–2016) (Brother of Turgut Özal; Minister of Agriculture and Forestry, 1974, 1975–77; Minister of the Interior, 1977–78)
 Yusuf Bozkurt Özal (1940–2001) (Brother of Turgut Özal; Member of Parliament, 1987–95)
Ahmet Özal (born 1955) (Son of Turgut Özal; Member of Parliament, 1999–2002)
 İbrahim Reyhan Özal (born 1965) (Son of Yusuf Bozkurt Özal; Member of Parliament, 2002–07)
Hüsnü Doğan (born 1944) (Nephew of Turgut Özal; Minister of National Defense, 1990–91)
The Özdağ family (father-son)

 Muzaffer Özdağ (1933–2002) (Member of Parliament, 1965–69)
 Ümit Özdağ (born 1961) (Member of Parliament, 2015–present; Leader of the Victory Party, 2021–present)

The Öztrak family

 Mehmet Faik Öztrak (1882–1951) (Minister of the Interior, 1939–42)
 Orhan Öztrak (1914–1995) (Son of Mehmet Faik Öztrak; Minister of the Interior, 1963–65)
İlhan Öztrak (1925–1992) (Son of Mehmet Faik Öztrak; Minister of State, 1971–74, 1980–83; Secretary General of the Turkish Presidency, 1980) 
 Faik Öztrak (born 1954) (Son of Orhan Öztrak; Member of Parliament, 2007–present)
The Pakdemirli family (father-son)

 Ekrem Pakdemirli (1939–2015) (Deputy Prime Minister, 1991)
 Bekir Pakdemirli (born 1973) (Minister of Agriculture and Forestry, 2018–22)

The Perinçek family (father-son)

 Sadık Perinçek (1915–2000) (Member of Parliament, 1954–57, 1961–73)
 Doğu Perinçek (born 1942) (Leader of the Patriotic Party, 1991–present, perennial candidate)
The Sazak family 

 Emin Sazak (1982–1960) (Member of Parliament, 1920–50)
 Gün Sazak (1932–1980) (Son of Emin Sazak; Minister of Customs and Monopolies, 1977–78)
 Süleyman Servet Sazak (born 1955) (Son of Gün Sazak; Member of Parliament, 1999–2002)
Cem Boyner (born 1955) (Son-in-law of Gün Sazak; Leader of the New Democracy Movement, 1994–96)

The Türkeş family

 Alparslan Türkeş (1917–1997) (Deputy Prime Minister, 1975–77, 1977–78)
Tuğrul Türkeş (born 1954) (Son of Alparslan Türkeş; Member of Parliament, 2007–present; Deputy Prime Minister, 2015–17)
 Ahmet Kutalmış Türkeş (born 1978) (Son of Alparslan Türkeş; Member of Parliament, 2011–15)
Hamza Hamit Homriş (1944–2016) (Son-in-law of Alparslan Türkeş; Member of Parliament, 2007–11)

Turkmenistan
The Berdimuhamedow family
 Gurbanguly Berdimuhamedow, President
 Serdar Berdimuhamedow, President

Tuvalu
The Latasi family
 Sir Kamuta Latasi (Prime Minister of Tuvalu, 1993–96)
 Lady Naama Maheu Latasi (wife of Kamuta Latasi; Member of Parliament)

Uganda
The Awori family (Kenya and Uganda)
 Aggrey Awori, formerly Member of Parliament and Minister.
 Moody Awori former Vice President of Kenya.

The Kakonge family
 Edward Kakonge, Current Chairman of Uganda Peoples Congress UPC (2011–present), Minister of Local Government and Minister of Youth Culture and Sports (1986–89), Chairman of Uganda Debt Network (2007–present)
 John Kakonge (First Secretary General of Uganda Peoples Congress, formerly a Minister in Obote I Government as Minister of Cooperatives and Agriculture. He disappeared on 16 November 1972 during the Idi Amin regime. He was also a brother of Edward Kakonge.
 Festus Kambarage Kakonge (Current Commissioner for National Guidance at the Information and National Guidance ministry, formerly Resident District Commissioner in Kotido and Kabarole districts in the Museveni Government. He is a brother to both John and Edward Kakonge.
 Mugisha Muntu (Retired) Major General (Current Forum for Democratic Change Party President – 22 November 2012 to present, formerly FDC Secretary for Mobilization, former EALA MP from 2001 to 2011, former Army Commander from 1989– 1998. Son-in-law of the late John Kakonge.

The Kiwanuka family
 Benedicto Kiwanuka, first Prime Minister of Uganda (1961–62), Chief Justice (1971–72), President of the Democratic Party.
 Maurice Kagimu Kiwanuka (Diplomat, formerly a Minister and Member of Parliament), son of Benedicto Kiwanuka.

The Lutwa Okello family
 General Tito Okello, former Army Commander and President of Uganda.
 Henry Oryem Okello (Member of Parliament and Minister), son of Tito Okello.

The Lule family
 Yusuf Lule, President (April–June 1980), Chairman of the Uganda National Liberation Front, first Chairman of the National Resistance Movement.
 Wasswa Lule (former Member of Parliament, former Deputy Inspector General of Government), son of Yusuf Lule.

The Museveni family
 Yoweri Museveni, President of Uganda, Chairman of the National Resistance Movement.
 Janet Museveni (Member of Parliament, Minister for Karamoja Affairs), wife of Yoweri Museveni.
 Major General Muhoozi Kainerugaba (Commander of Special Forces Group of Uganda People's Defence Force), son of Yoweri and Janet Museveni.
 General Caleb Akandwanaho (Presidential Advisor, former Army Commander, Minister and Member of Parliament), brother of Yoweri Museveni.
 Sam Kutesa (Minister of Foreign Affairs, Member of Parliament), brother-in-law of Yoweri Museveni.

The Obote family
 Milton Obote (1924–2005), Prime Minister (1962–67), President (1967–71, 1981–85).
 Miria Obote (President of the Uganda People's Congress 2005–10), wife of Milton Obote.
 Jimmy Akena (Member of Parliament), son of Milton and Miria Obote.
 Betty Amongi Ongom (Member of Parliament and Cabinet Minister of Lands, Housing and Urban Development), wife of Jimmy Akena and daughter-in-law of Milton and Miria Obote.
 Akbar Adoko Nekyon (former Member of Parliament and Minister), cousin of Milton Obote.

Ukraine

The Kuchma-Pinchuk family (father-in-law and son-in-law)

 Leonid Kuchma (b. 1938), President of Ukraine, from 1994 to 2005.
 Victor Pinchuk (b. 1960), member of the Ukrainian Parliament, Verkhovna Rada, for two consecutive terms from 1998 to 2006, son-in-law to Leonid Kuchma.

United Kingdom

United States

Uruguay
The Arismendi family (father and daughter)
 Rodney Arismendi (leader of Communist Party of Uruguay)
 Marina Arismendi (leader of Communist Party of Uruguay), daughter of Rodney Arismendi

The Batlle family (grandfather, son, grandsons and great-grandson)
 Lorenzo Batlle y Grau (President of Uruguay, 1868–72)
 José Batlle y Ordóñez (President of Uruguay, 1899, 1903–07 and 1911–15), son of Lorenzo Batlle y Grau
 César Batlle Pacheco (Deputy and Senator), son of José Batlle y Ordóñez, grandnephew of Duncan Stewart
 Lorenzo Batlle Pacheco (Deputy and Senator), son of José Batlle y Ordóñez, grandnephew of Duncan Stewart
 Rafael Batlle Pacheco (political journalist), son of José Batlle y Ordóñez, grandnephew of Duncan Stewart
 Luis Batlle Berres (President of Uruguay, 1947–51), nephew of José Batlle y Ordóñez, cousin of César, Rafael, and Lorenzo Batlle Pacheco
 Jorge Batlle Ibáñez (President of Uruguay, 2000–05), son of Luis Batlle Berres and grandnephew of José Batlle y Ordóñez
 Carolina Ache Batlle (Deputy Minister of Foreign Relations since 2020), great-granddaughter of Luis Batlle Berres, and great-niece of Jorge Batlle Ibáñez

The Bauzá family (father and son)
 Rufino Bauzá (Uruguayan independence fighter and military figure)
 Francisco Bauzá (Political figure and historian), son of Rufino Bauzá

The Beltrán family (father and son)
 Washington Beltrán Barbat (Blanco Party Deputy, killed by José Batlle y Ordóñez)
 Washington Beltrán (President of Uruguay, 1965–66), son of Washington Beltrán Barbat

The Blanco family (grandfather, sons and grandson)
 Juan Carlos Blanco Fernández (Foreign Minister of Uruguay)
 Juan Carlos Blanco Acevedo (Foreign Minister of Uruguay), son of Juan Carlos Blanco Fernández
 Daniel Blanco Acevedo (Deputy for Montevideo), son of Juan Carlos Blanco Fernández brother of Juan Carlos Blanco Acevedo
 Juan Carlos Blanco Estradé (Foreign Minister of Uruguay, UN Ambassador, and Senator), son of Daniel Blanco Acevedo

The Bordaberry family (grandfather, son and grandsons)
 Domingo Bordaberry (Senator, and Ruralist leader)
 Juan María Bordaberry (President of Uruguay, 1972–76), son of Domingo Bordaberry
 Pedro Bordaberry (former Industry and Tourism Minister), son of Juan María Bordaberry
 Santiago Bordaberry (Rural Affairs Activist), son of Juan María Bordaberry, brother of Pedro Bordaberry

The Brum brothers
 Baltasar Brum (President of Uruguay, 1919–1923)
 Alfeo Brum (Vice President of Uruguay, 1947–1955), brother of Baltasar Brum

The Cuestas family (father and son)
 Juan Lindolfo Cuestas (President of Uruguay, 1897–99 and 1899–1903)
 Juan Cuestas (Diplomat and political activist), son of Juan Lindolfo Cuestas

The Demicheli family (spouses)
 Alberto Demicheli (President of Uruguay, 1976)
 Sofía Álvarez Vignoli de Demicheli (Senator and diplomat), wife of Alberto Demicheli

The Ellauri family (father, son and great grandson)
 José Longinos Ellauri Fernández (President of the Constituent Assembly of 1830; Foreign Minister of Uruguay, 1830 and 1839; Deputy, 1834–37;Attorney General of the Republic, 1839 and 1856–57, Plenipotentiary Ministry, 1839–55; Government Ministry, 1856)
 José Eugenio Ellauri y Obes (President of Uruguay, 1873–75), son of José Longinos Ellauri Fernández
 Oscar Secco Ellauri (Education and Culture Minister, 1948–51 and Foreign Affairs Minister, 1957–59) grandnephew of José Eugenio Ellauri y Obes and great grandson of José Longinos Ellauri Fernández

The Fernández family (father and son)
 Hugo Fernández Artucio (former Socialist leader; subsequent Colorado trade union organizer)
 Hugo Fernández Faingold (Vice President of Uruguay, 1998–2000), son of Hugo Fernández Artucio

The Forteza family (father and son)
 Francisco Forteza (Deputy, Senator; Defence Minister 1947–51)
 Francisco Forteza (son) (Deputy, Senator, Economy Minister 1972), son of Francisco Forteza

The Grauert brothers
 Julio César Grauert (Deputy)
 Héctor Grauert (Senator), brother of Julio César Grauert

The Héber family (brothers and son of one of them)
 Alberto Héber Usher (President of Uruguay, 1966–67)
 Mario Héber Usher (Deputy and Senator), brother of Alberto Héber Usher
 Luis Alberto Héber (Deputy and Senator), son of Mario Héber Usher

The Herrera family (great-grandfather, father and son)
Luis Alberto de Herrera (In 1925–27 he presided over the National Council of Administration)
 Luis Alberto Lacalle de Herrera (President of Uruguay, 1990–95) and grandson of political leader Luis Alberto de Herrera
 Luis Alberto Lacalle Pou (President of Uruguay since 2020), son of Luis Alberto Lacalle

The Hierro family (grandfather, son and grandson)
 Luis Hierro (Deputy)
 Luis Hierro Gambardella (Minister, Deputy and Senator), son of Luis Hierro
 Luis Antonio Hierro López (Vice President of Uruguay 2000–05), son of Luis Hierro Gambardella

The Jude family (father and son)
 Raúl Jude (Deputy, Justice and Interior Minister, and Senator)
 Raumar Jude, (Deputy and Senator), son of Raúl Jude

The Michelini family (father and sons)
 Zelmar Michelini (Senator, Minister of the Industry and he participated in the foundation of the Frente Amplio
 Rafael Michelini (Senator and founder of Nuevo Espacio)
 Felipe Michelini (Deputy and Subsecretary of the Ministry of Education and Culture)

The Mujica-Topolansky family (spouses)
 José Mujica (President of Uruguay 2010-2015, former Senator, former Agriculture Minister)
 Lucía Topolansky (Vice President of Uruguay, 2017-2020, Senator, former Deputy), wife of José Mujica

The Nin brothers
 Rodolfo Nin Novoa (Vice President of Uruguay, 2005–)
 Gonzalo Nin Novoa (Vice Presidential administrator), brother of Rodolfo Nin Novoa

The Pacheco family
 Manuel Pacheco (Legislator of Uruguay)
 Jorge Pacheco Areco (President of Uruguay, 1967–1972) grandson of Manuel Pacheco
 Jorge Pacheco Klein (Colorado Party deputy), son of Jorge Pacheco Areco

The Ramírez family
 Juan Andrés Ramírez Chain (Blanco leader), had two notable grandchildren:
 Juan Andrés Ramírez (former Interior Minister)
 Gonzalo Aguirre Ramírez (Vice President of Uruguay, 1990–95), cousin of the former

The Saravia family (brothers and descendant of one of them)
 Gumercindo Saravia (Civil War leader in Rio Grande, Brazil)
 Aparicio Saravia (National (Blanco) Party and Uruguayan Civil War Leader, killed 1904), younger brother of Gumercindo Saravia
 Villanueva Saravia, (National (Blanco) Party Regional Government Leader), great-great-grandson of Aparicio Saravia

The Sanguinetti family (cousins)
 Julio María Sanguinetti (President of Uruguay, 1985–90 and 1995–2000)
 Jorge Sanguinetti (former Minister of Transport and Works), cousin of Julio María Sanguinetti
Carmen Sanguinetti (Senator since 2020), niece of Jorge Sanguinetti

The Sendic family (father and son)
 Raúl Sendic (leader of Tupamaros)
 Raúl Fernando Sendic Rodríguez (former Industry Minister, son of Raúl Sendic

The Stewart family (descendant)
 Duncan Stewart (President of Uruguay, 1894)
 Matilde Pacheco Stewart de Batlle y Ordóñez (First Lady of Uruguay, 1899, 1903–07, 1911–15), niece of Duncan Stewart, wife of José Batlle y Ordóñez
 César Batlle Pacheco (Deputy and Senator), son of José Batlle y Ordóñez, grandnephew of Duncan Stewart
 Lorenzo Batlle Pacheco (Deputy and Senator), son of José Batlle y Ordóñez, grandnephew of Duncan Stewart
 Jorge Pacheco Areco (President of Uruguay, 1967–72), grandnephew of Duncan Stewart
 Jorge Pacheco Klein (Colorado Party deputy), son of Jorge Pacheco Areco

The Stirling family (grandfather and grandson)
 Manuel Stirling (Deputy and Senator)
 Guillermo Stirling (former Interior Minister), grandson of Manuel Stirling

The Terra-Baldomir family
 Gabriel Terra (President of Uruguay, 1931–38)
 Horacio Terra Arocena (Senator), nephew of Gabriel Terra
 Juan Pablo Terra (Deputy and Senator), son of Horacio Terra Arocena
 Alfredo Baldomir (President of Uruguay, 1938–43), brother-in-law of Gabriel Terra

The Tourné family (uncle and niece)
 Uruguay Tourné (former Deputy and Senator)
 Daisy Tourné (former Interior Minister), niece of Uruguay Tourné

The Wílliman family (grandfather and grandson)
 Claudio Wílliman (President of Uruguay 1907–1911)
 José Claudio Wílliman (Served in Uruguayan Senate 1985–90), grandson of Claudio Wílliman

The Végh family (father and son)
 Carlos Végh Garzón (Economy Minister 1967)
 Alejandro Végh Villegas (Economy Minister, 1970s and 1980s), son of Carlos Végh Garzón

The Zorrilla de San Martín family (grandfather and grandson)
 Juan Zorrilla de San Martín (Poet and Deputy)
 Alejandro Zorrilla de San Martín, (Deputy, Foreign Affairs Minister, and Senator), grandson of Juan Zorrilla de San Martín

Uzbekistan
The Karimov family
Islam Karimov (President of Uzbekistan, 1991–2016)
Tatyana Karimova (wife of Islam Karimov; First Lady, 1991–2016)
Gulnora Karimova (eldest daughter of Islam Karimov; businesswoman and politician)
Lola Karimova-Tillyaeva (youngest daughter of Islam Karimov; diplomat and philanthropist)

Vanuatu
The Lini family
Walter Lini (Prime Minister of Vanuatu, 1980–91)
Ham Lini (brother; Prime Minister of Vanuatu, 2004–08)
Hilda Lini (sister; Member of Parliament)
Kalkot Mataskelekele (brother-in-law; President of Vanuatu, 2004–09)

The Sokomanu-Sopé family
Ati George Sokomanu (President of Vanuatu, 1980–1989)
Barak Sopé (nephew of Ati George Sokomanu; Prime Minister of Vanuatu, 1999–2001)

Venezuela
The Chávez family
Hugo de los Reyes Chávez (father of Adán & Hugo Chávez; Politician)
Adán Chávez (Governor of Barinas)
Hugo Chávez (61st President of Venezuela)
Marisabel Rodríguez de Chávez (ex-wife of Hugo Chávez; First Lady 1999–2002)
The Sucre family
Antonio José de Sucre (President of Bolivia, South American Independence War Hero)
Juan Manuel Sucre (Commander-in-Chief of Army 1974)
Leopoldo Sucre (Public Works Minister; Senator)
José Francisco Sucre (Ambassador; Senator)

Vietnam
The Ngô family
 Ngô Đình Diệm (1901–1963)
 Ngô Đình Nhu
 Madame Ngô Đình Nhu

Yemen
The Al-Shaabi family (brothers-in-law)
Qahtan Muhammad al-Shaabi (President of South Yemen, 1967–69)
Faysal al-Shaabi (Prime Minister of South Yemen, 1969)

The Iryani family (uncle-nephew)
Abdul Rahman al-Iryani (President of North Yemen, 1967–74)
Abdul Karim al-Iryani (Prime Minister of Yemen, 1998–2001)

The Saleh family (father-son)
Ali Abdullah Saleh (President of North Yemen, 1978–90 and President of Yemen, 1990–present)
Ahmad Ali Abdullah Saleh (Member of Parliament)

Zambia
The Chiluba family
Frederick Chiluba (President of Zambia, 1991–2002)
Benjamin Mwila (cousin of Frederick Chiluba; leader of Zambia Republican Party)

The Kaunda family
Kenneth Kaunda (President of Zambia, 1964–91)
Tilyenji Kaunda (son of Kenneth Kaunda; secretary-general, United National Independence Party)

Zimbabwe
The Mugabe-Chiyangwa family
Robert Mugabe (President of Zimbabwe, 1987–2017; Prime Minister of Zimbabwe, 1980–87)
Sabina Mugabe (sister of Robert Mugabe; Member of Parliament)
Innocent Mugabe (son of Sabina Mugabe; Director of the Central Intelligence Organisation)
Leo Mugabe (son of Sabina Mugabe; businessman and Member of Parliament)
Patrick Zhuwawo (son of Sabina Mugabe; businessman and Member of Parliament)
Philip Chiyangwa (cousin of Robert Mugabe; businessman and ZANU-PF regional leader)

The Mujuru family
 Gen. Solomon 'Rex Nhongo' Mujuru
 Joyce "Teurai Ropa" Mujuru, Vice President

See also
 Hereditary politicians
 Dynasty
 List of dynasties

References

Political families